= United States Colored Troops =

American Civil War military unit

USCT
- United States Colored Troops
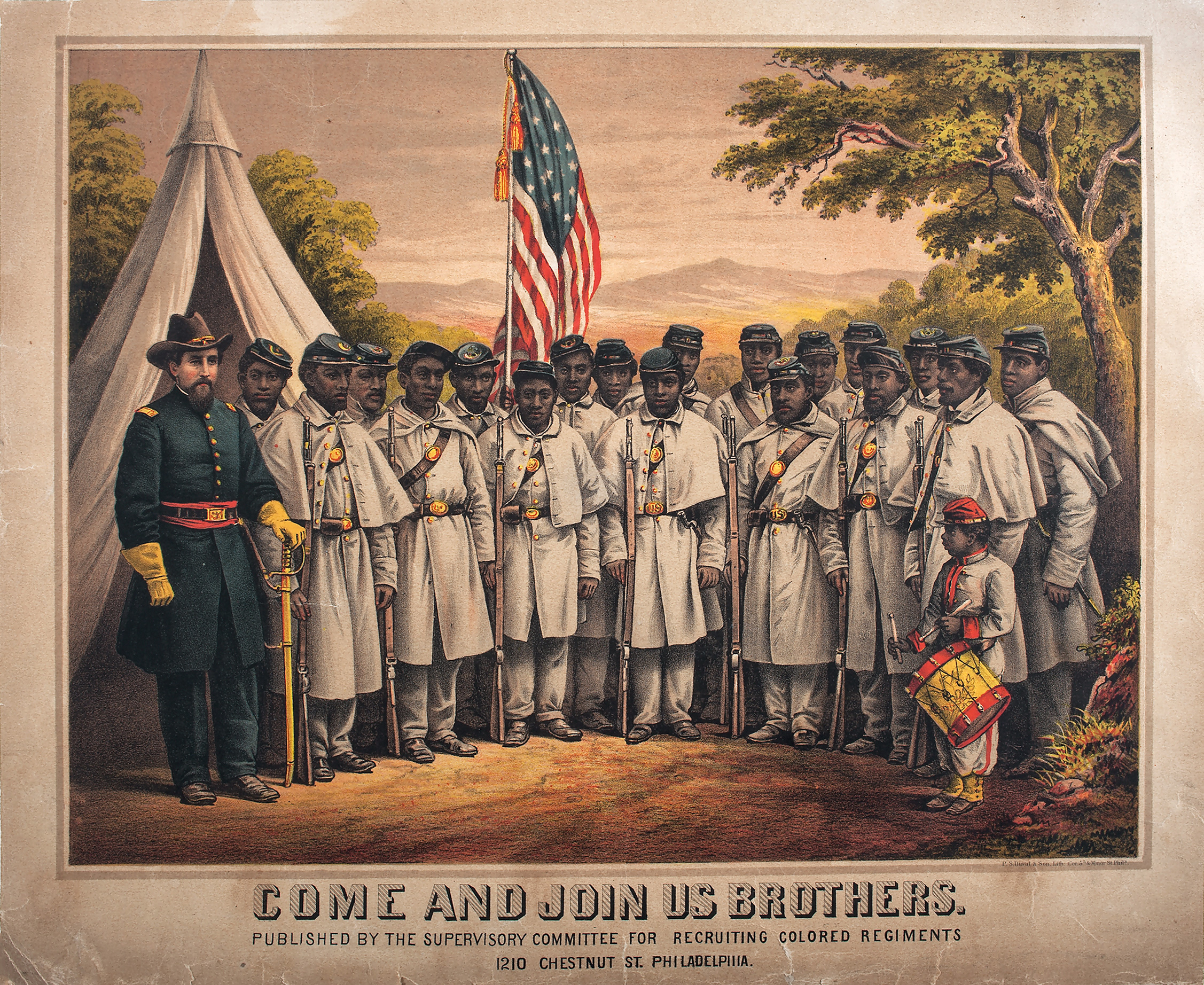
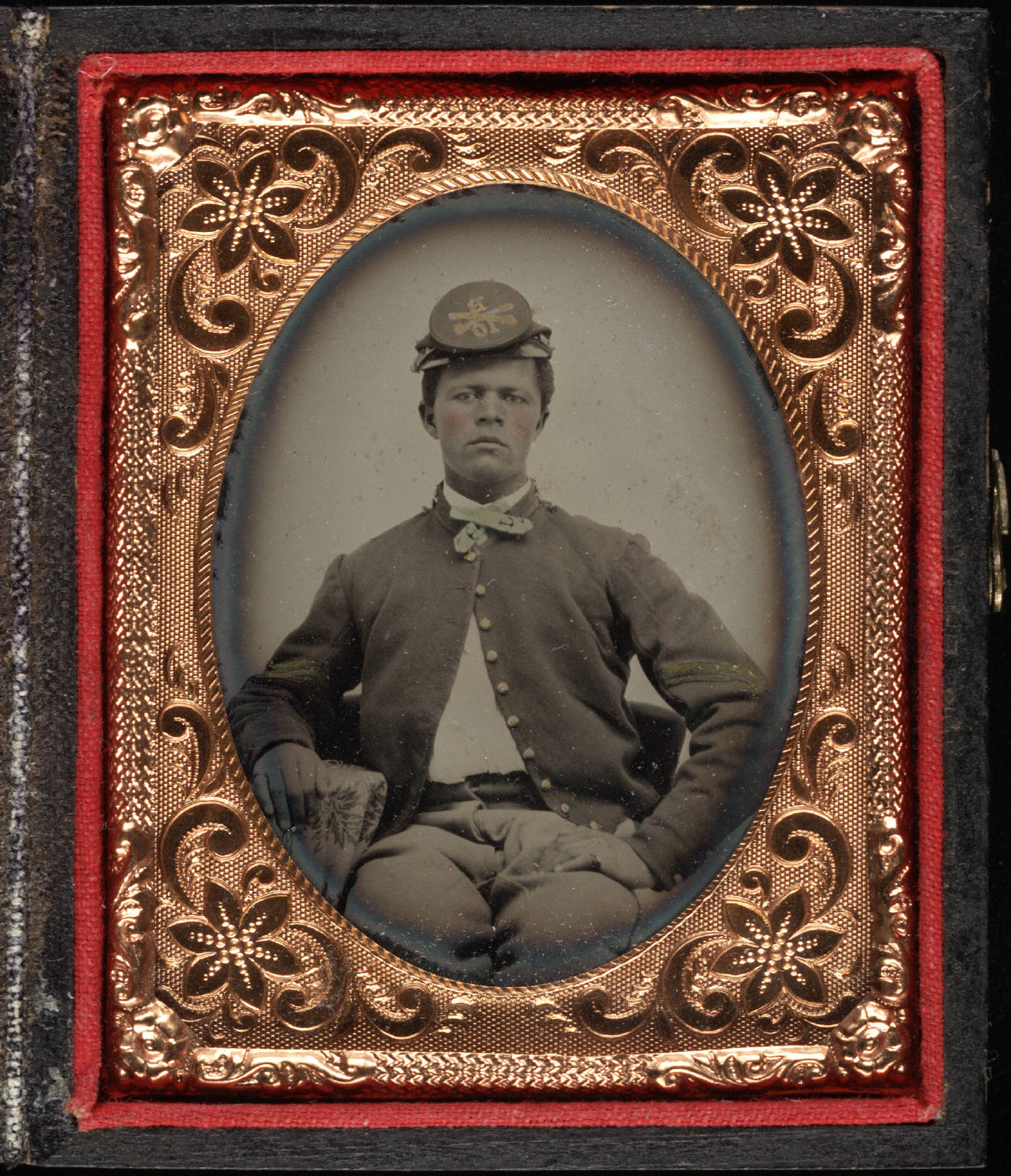
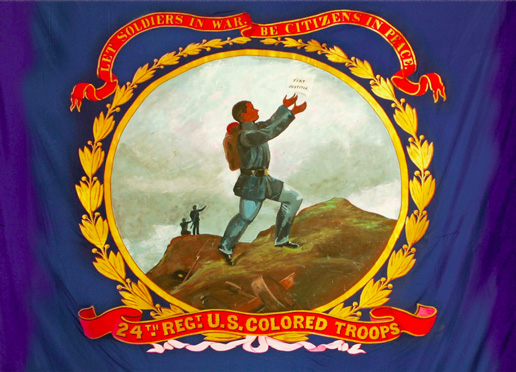
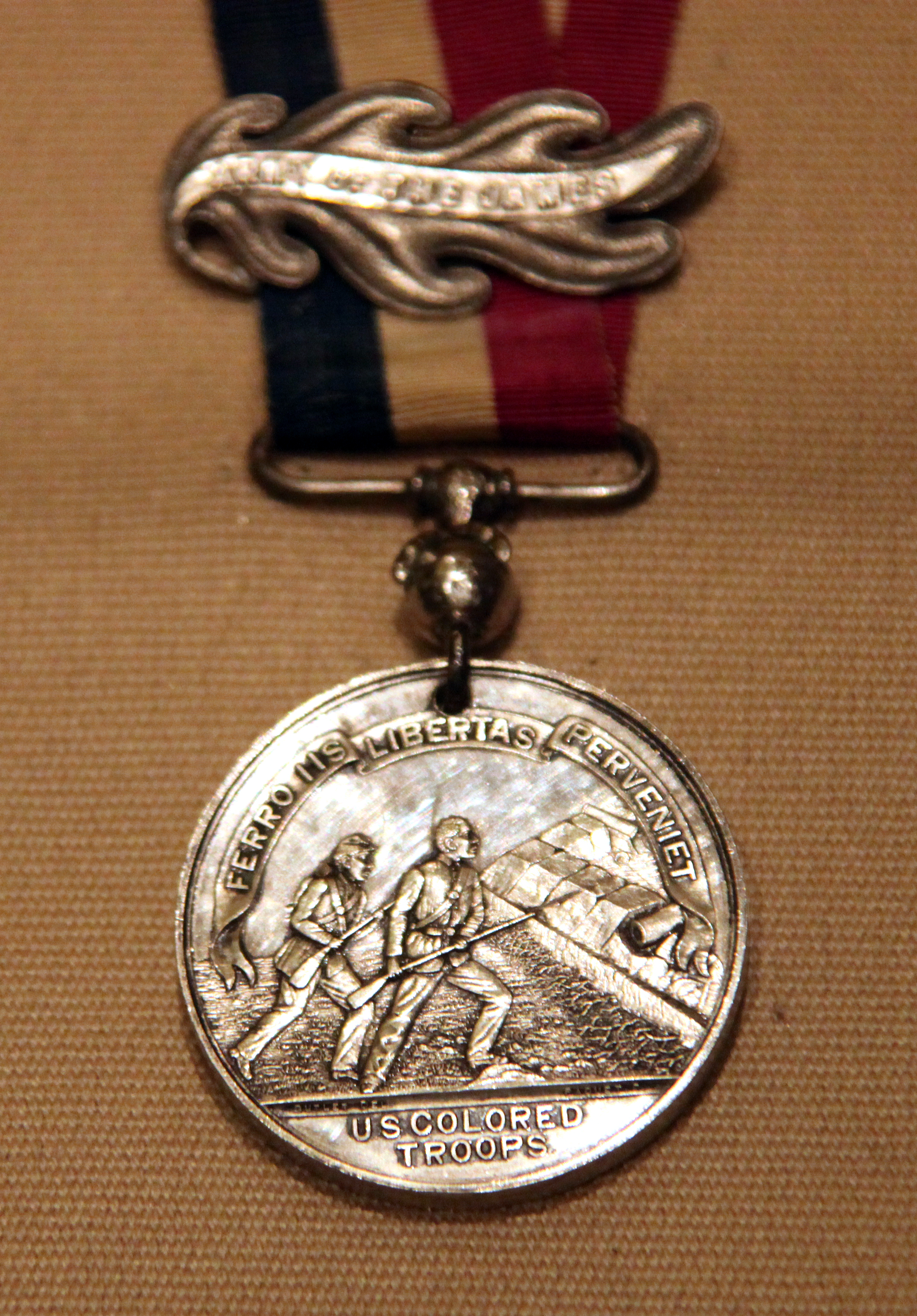
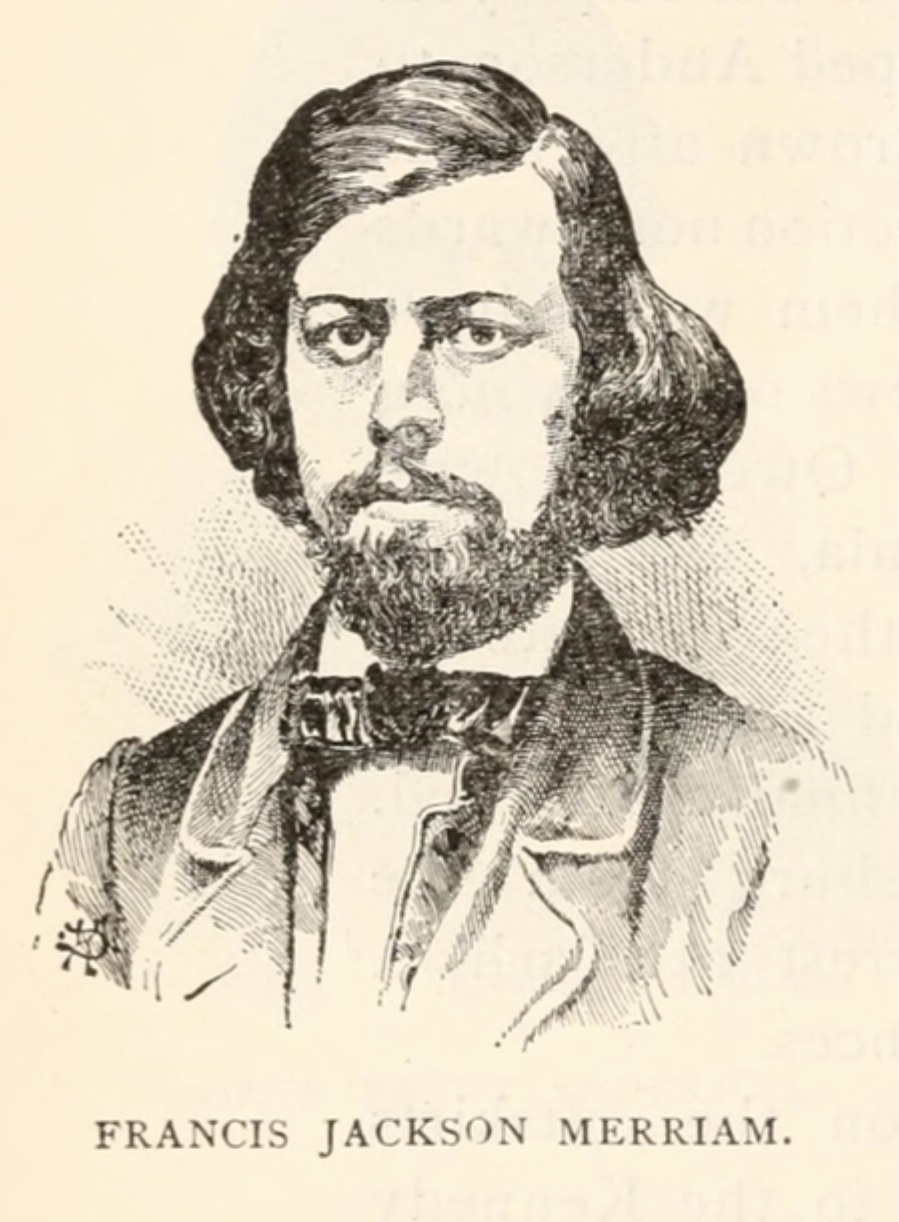
- USCT recruiting poster Unidentified private 24th US Colored Troops banner U.S. Colored Troops medal (Note: This U.S. Colored Troops medal was issued by General Butler) Captain Meriam (Note: Capt. Francis Jackson Meriam (pictured), was commander of the 3rd South Carolina Colored Infantry.)
- Active: May 22, 1863 – Oct 1865
- Disbanded: October 1865; 160 years ago
- Allegiance: Union
- Branch: Army
- Type: infantry, cavalry, artillery, engineering
- Size: 175 regiments; 178,000 men
- Engagements: American Civil War

United States Colored Troops (USCT) were Union Army regiments during the American Civil War that primarily comprised African Americans, with soldiers from other ethnic groups also serving in USCT units. Established in response to a demand for more units from Union Army commanders, USCT regiments, which totaled 175 by the end of the war in 1865, constituted about one-tenth of the manpower of the army, according to historian Kelly Mezurek, author of For Their Own Cause: The 27th United States Colored Troops (The Kent State University Press, 2016). "They served in infantry, artillery, and cavalry." Approximately 20 percent of USCT soldiers were killed in action or died of disease and other causes, a rate about 35 percent higher than that of white Union troops. Numerous USCT soldiers fought with distinction, with 16 receiving the Medal of Honor. The USCT regiments were precursors to the Buffalo Soldier units which fought in the American Indian Wars.

The courage displayed by colored troops during the Civil War played an important role in African Americans gaining new rights. As Frederick Douglass said in an 1863 speech:

Once let the black man get upon his person the brass letters U.S.; let him get an eagle on his button, and a musket on his shoulder, and bullets in his pocket, and there is no power on the earth or under the earth which can deny that he has earned the right of citizenship in the United States.

== Background ==
=== The Confiscation Act ===
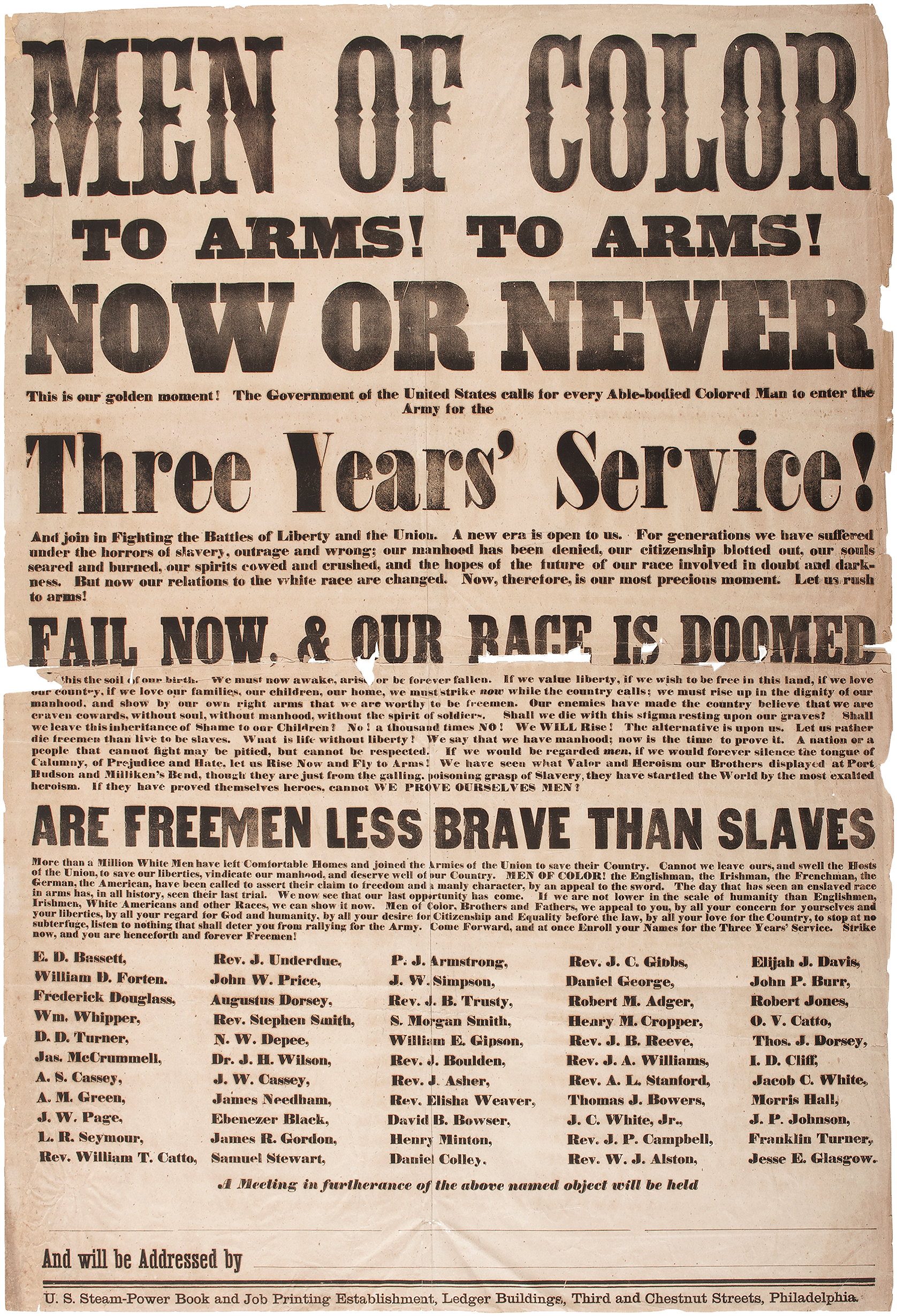
1863 recruitment broadside for the USCT written by Frederick Douglass

The U.S. Congress passed the Confiscation Act in July 1862, legalizing the practice of Union officers freeing slaves and putting them to work as army laborers. Congress also passed the Militia Act, which empowered the President to use free blacks and former slaves from the rebel states in any capacity in the army. President Abraham Lincoln was concerned with public opinion in the four border states that remained in the Union, as they had numerous slaveholders, as well as with northern Democrats who supported the war but were less supportive of abolition than many northern Republicans. At first, Lincoln opposed early efforts to recruit African American soldiers, although he accepted the Army using them as paid workers. In September 1862, Lincoln issued his Emancipation Proclamation, announcing that all slaves in rebellious states would be free as of January 1. Recruitment and training of colored regiments began in full force following the Proclamation in January 1863.

== Formation ==
The United States War Department issued General Order Number 143 on May 22, 1863, establishing the Bureau of Colored Troops to facilitate the recruitment of African-American soldiers to fight for the Union Army. Regiments, including infantry, cavalry, engineers, light artillery, and heavy artillery units were recruited from all states of the Union. Approximately 175 regiments comprising more than 178,000 free blacks and freedmen served during the last two years of the war. Their service bolstered the Union war effort at a critical time.

Initially, the USCT were relegated to menial jobs such as that of laborers, teamsters, cooks, and other support duties. However, even these duties were essential to the war effort. For example, USCT engineers built Fort Pocahontas, a Union supply depot, in Charles City, Virginia. Eventually USCT were sent into combat.

The USCT suffered 2,751 combat deaths during the war, and 68,178 losses from all causes. Disease caused the most fatalities for all troops, both black and white. In the last year-and-a-half and from all reported casualties, approximately 20% of all African Americans enrolled in the military died. Notably, their mortality rate was significantly higher than white soldiers:

[We] find, according to the revised official data, that of the slightly over two millions troops in the United States Volunteers, over 316,000 died (from all causes), or 15.2%. Of the 67,000 Regular Army (white) troops, 8.6%, or not quite 6,000, died. Of the approximately 180,000 United States Colored Troops, however, over 36,000 died, or 20.5%. In other words, the mortality rate amongst the United States Colored Troops in the Civil War was thirty-five percent greater than that among other troops, notwithstanding the fact that the former were not enrolled until some eighteen months after the fighting began.

— Herbert Aptheker

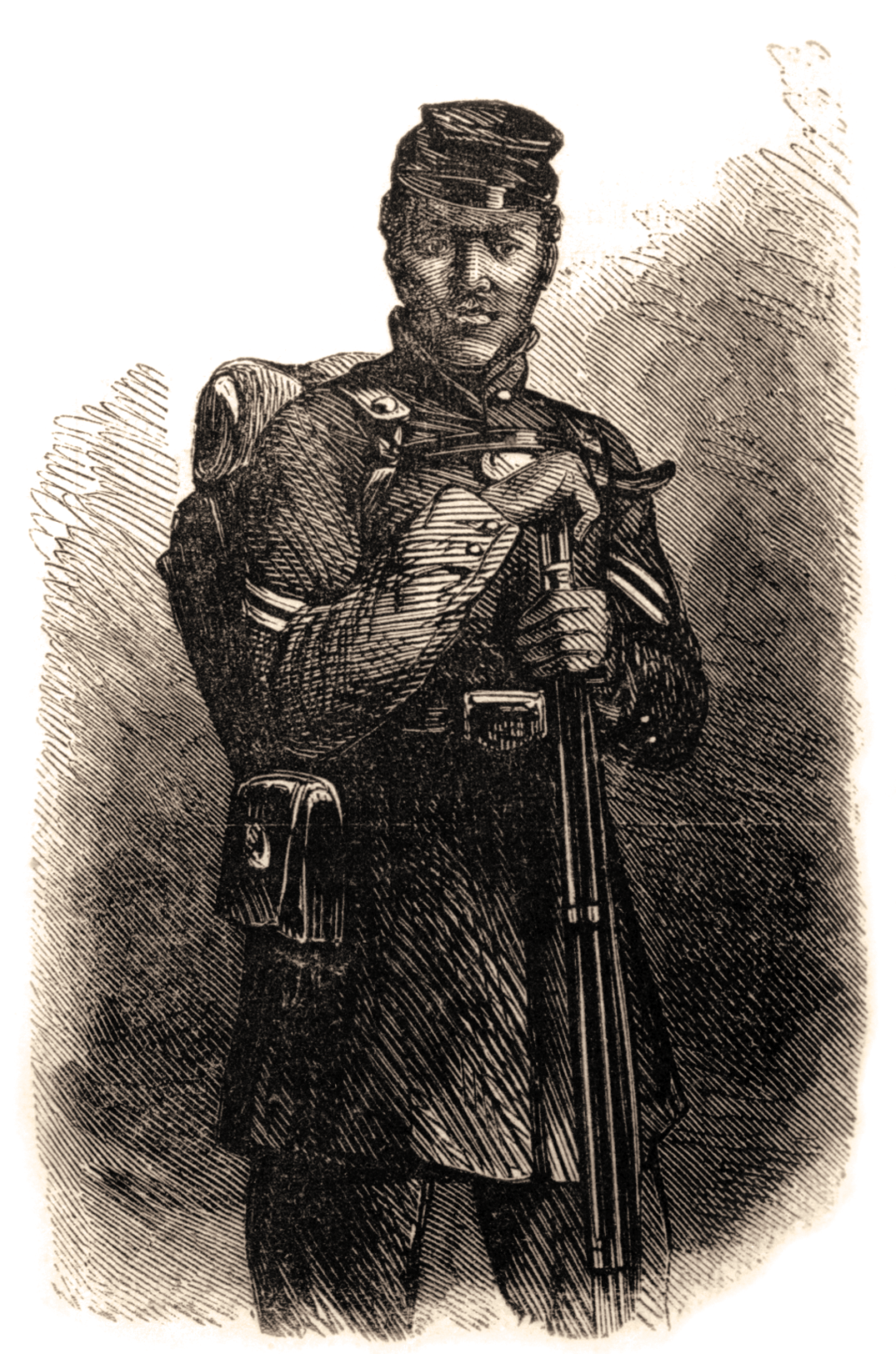
Escaped slave, Gordon (also called "Whipped Peter"), in USCT uniform

USCT regiments were led by white Union officers, while rank advancement was limited for Black soldiers, who could only rise to the rank of non-commissioned officers. Approximately 110 Black soldiers did become commissioned officers before the end of the war, primarily as surgeons or chaplains. One USCT artillery unit, the Independent Battery from Kansas, is notable as the only unit in the Civil War to be commanded entirely by Black officers. The Supervisory Committee for Recruiting Colored Regiments in Philadelphia opened the Free Military Academy for Applicants for the Command of Colored Troops at the end of 1863. For a time, Black soldiers received less pay than their white counterparts, but they and their supporters lobbied and eventually gained equal pay. Notable members of USCT regiments included Martin Robinson Delany and the sons of abolitionist Frederick Douglass.

The process for white officers aiming to lead USCT units was considered more protracted and perhaps rigorous than for ordinary Union officers. This was because it was assumed that leading Black soldiers would require a better officer than those leading white troops. At the end of their studies, those men who wished to lead Black troops had to pass an examination administered by Brig. Gen. Silas Casey's staff in Washington. After a short period of examinations in mid-1863, only half of the men who had taken the exam passed.

=== Volunteer regiments ===
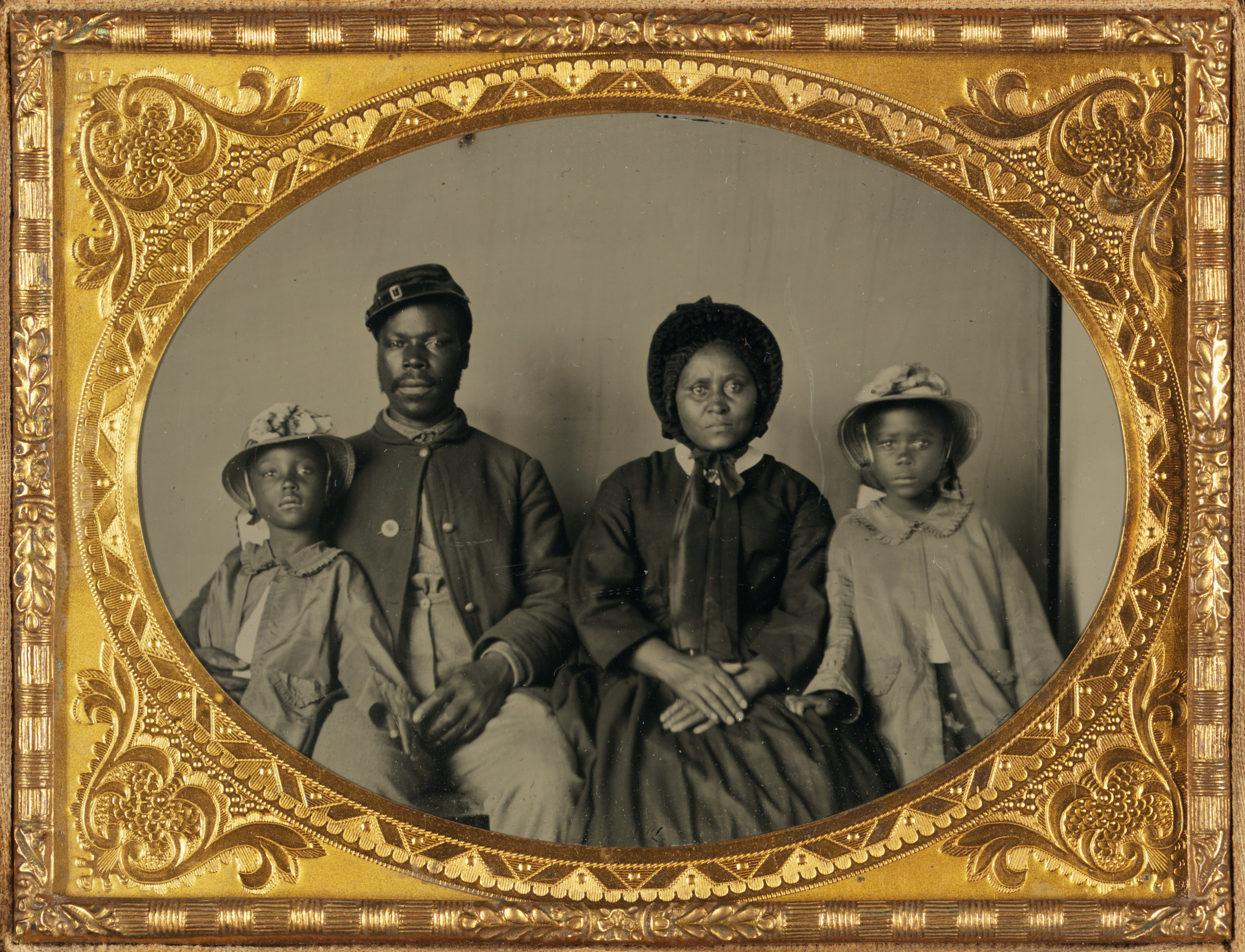
Sgt. Samuel Smith of the 119th USCT, in uniform, with his family

Before the USCT was formed, several volunteer regiments were raised from free black men, including freedmen in the South. In 1863 a former slave, William Henry Singleton, helped recruit 1,000 former slaves in New Bern, North Carolina, for the First North Carolina Colored Volunteers. He became a sergeant in the 35th USCT. Freedmen from the Roanoke Island Freedmen's Colony, established in 1863 on the island, also formed part of the Free North Carolina Colored Volunteers (FNCCV) and subsequently the 35th. Nearly all of the volunteer regiments were converted into USCT units.

In 1922 Singleton published his memoir (in a slave narrative) of his journey from slavery to freedom and becoming a Union soldier. Glad to participate in reunions, years later at the age of 95, he marched in a Grand Army of the Republic (GAR) event in 1938.

=== State volunteers ===
Six regiments were considered regular units, rather than auxiliaries. Their veteran status allowed them to get federal government jobs after the war, from which African Americans had usually been excluded in earlier years. However, the men received no formal recognition for combat honors and awards until the turn of the 20th century. These units were:

- 5th Regiment Massachusetts Colored Volunteer Cavalry
- 54th Massachusetts (Colored) Volunteer Infantry Regiment
- 55th Massachusetts (Colored) Volunteer Infantry Regiment
- 29th Connecticut (Colored) Volunteer Infantry Regiment
- 30th Connecticut Volunteer Infantry Regiment
- 31st Infantry Regiment (Colored)

=== 1st Louisiana Native Guard (Corps d'Afrique) ===
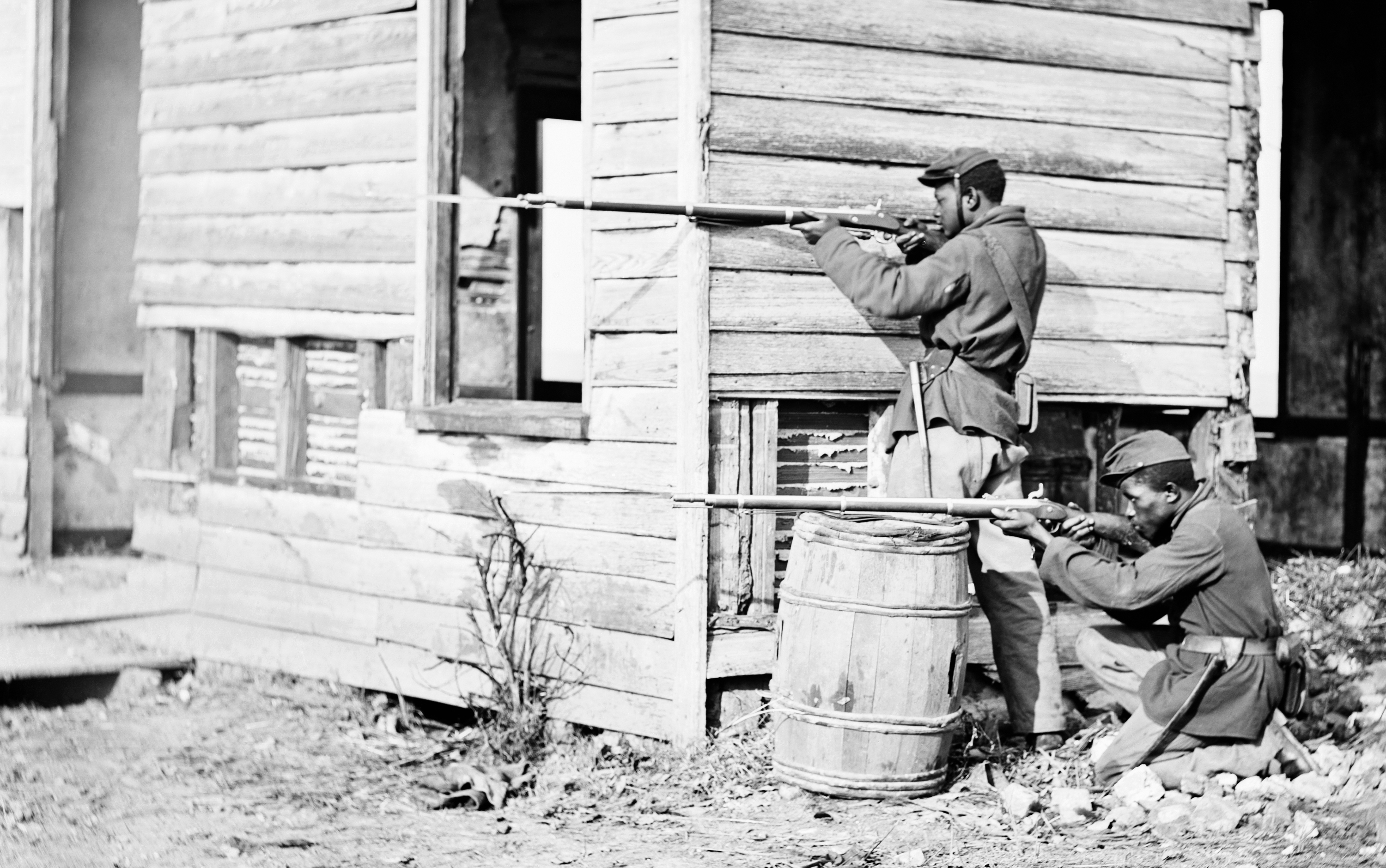
USCT soldiers at an abandoned farmhouse in Dutch Gap, Virginia, 1864

The 1st Louisiana Native Guard, one of many Louisiana Union Civil War units, was formed in New Orleans after the city was taken and occupied by Union forces. It was formed in part from the Confederacy's former unit of the same name, which had been made up of property-owning free people of color (gens de couleur libres). These men had wanted to prove their bravery and loyalty to the Confederacy like other Southern property owners by joining Confederate Black soldiers, but the Confederacy did not allow them to serve and confiscated their arms.

For the new unit, the Union also recruited freedmen from the refugee camps. Liberated from nearby plantations, they and their families had no means to earn a living and no place to go. Local commanders, starved for replacements, started equipping volunteer units with cast-off uniforms and obsolete or captured firearms. The men were treated and paid as auxiliaries, performing guard or picket duties to free up white soldiers for maneuver units. In exchange their families were fed, clothed and housed for free at the Army camps; often schools were set up for them and their children.

Despite class differences between free Black people and freedmen, the troops of the new guard served with distinction, including under Captain Andre Cailloux at the Battle of Port Hudson and throughout the South. Its units included:

- 4 Regiments of Louisiana Native Guards (renamed the 1st–4th Corps d'Afrique Infantry, later renamed as the 73rd–76th US Colored Infantry on April 4, 1864).
- 1st and 2nd Brigade Marching Bands, Corps d'Afrique (later made into Nos. 1 and 2 Bands, USCT).
- 1st Regiment of Cavalry (1st Corps d'Afrique Cavalry, later made into the 4th US Colored Cavalry).
- 22 Regiments of Infantry (1st–20th, 22nd, and 26th Corps d'Afrique Infantry, later converted into the 77th–79th, 80th–83rd, 84th–88th, and 89th–93rd US Colored Infantry on April 4, 1864).
- 5 Regiments of Engineers (1st–5th Corps d'Afrique Engineers, later converted into the 95th–99th US Colored Infantry regiments on April 4, 1864) whose work building Bailey's Dam saved the Union navy's Mississippi River Squadron.
- 1 Regiment of Heavy Artillery (later converted into the 10th US Colored (Heavy) Artillery on May 21, 1864).

=== Right Wing, XVI Corps (1864) ===
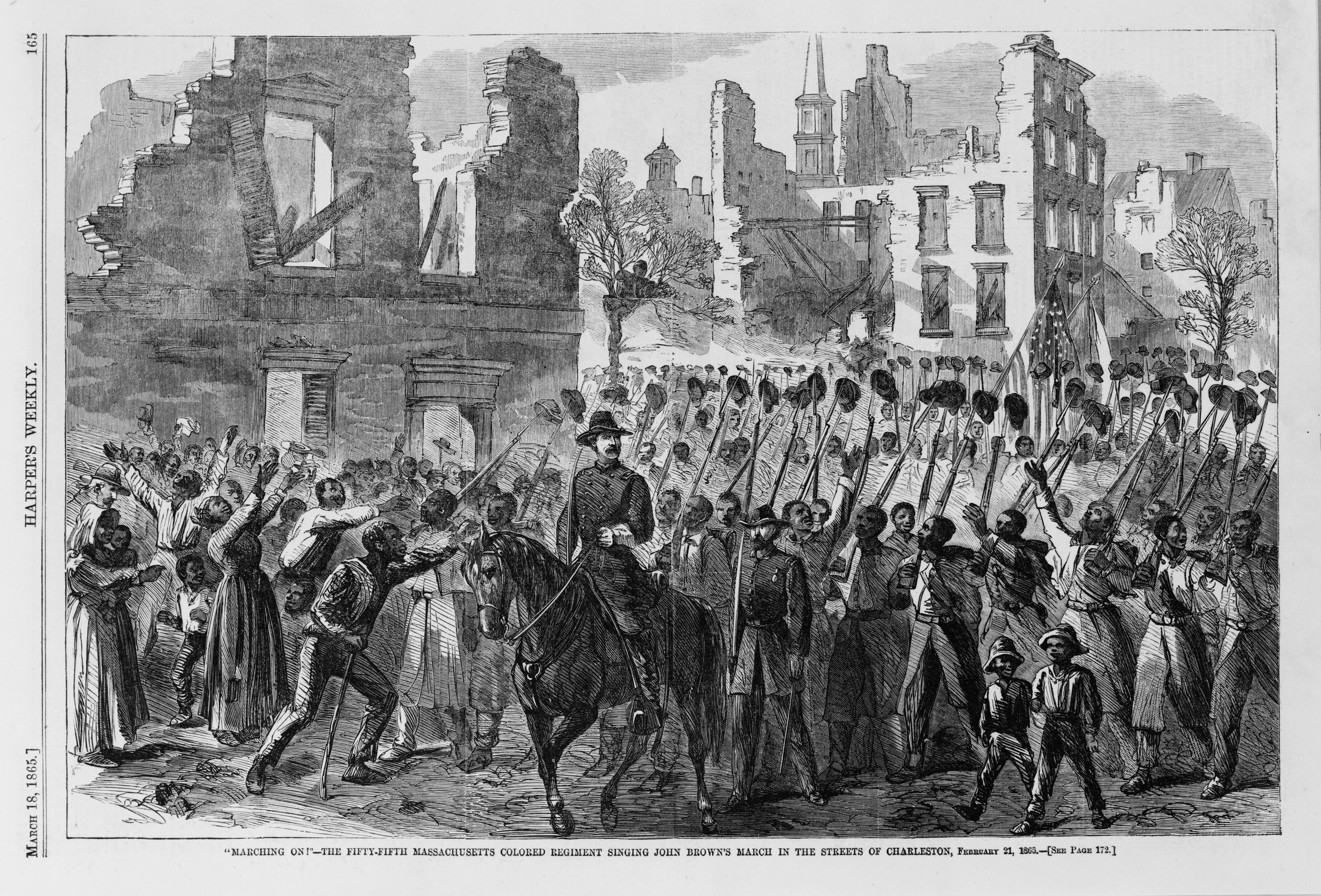
Colored Troops singing "John Brown's Body" as they marched into Charleston, South Carolina, in February 1865. Note the attitude of the local population, and the white officers.

Colored troops served as laborers in the 16th Army Corps' Quartermaster's Department and Pioneer Corps.

- Detachment, Quartermaster's Department.
- Pioneer Corps, 1st Division (Mower), 16th Army Corps.
- Pioneer Corps, Cavalry Division (Grierson), 16th Army Corps.

=== USCT Regiments ===
- 6 Regiments of Cavalry [1st–6th USC Cavalry]
- 1 Regiment of Light Artillery (2nd USC (Light) Artillery)
- 1 Independent USC (Heavy) Artillery Battery
- 13 Heavy Artillery Regiments [1st and 3rd–14th USC (Heavy) Artillery]
- 1 unassigned Company of Infantry [Company A, US Colored Infantry]
- 1 Independent USC Company of Infantry (Southard's Independent Company, Pennsylvania (Colored) Infantry)
- 1 Independent USC Regiment of Infantry [Powell's Regiment, US Colored Infantry]
- 135 Regiments of Infantry [1st–138th USC Infantry] (The 94th, 105th, and 126th USC Infantry regiments were never fully formed)

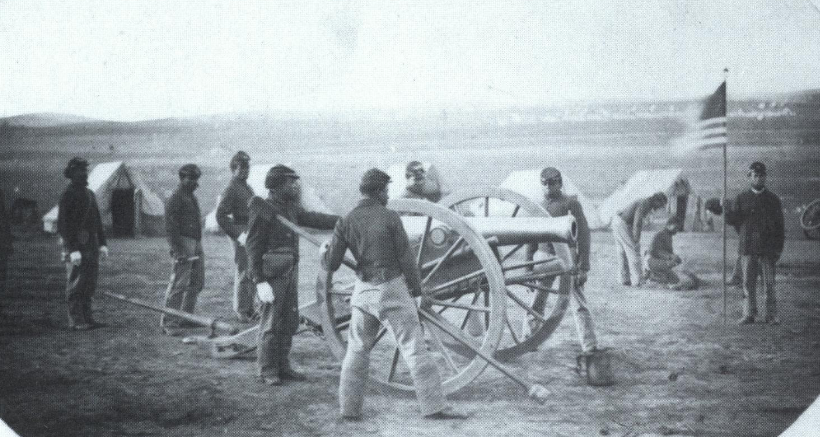
Soldiers of Battery A, 2nd Light Artillery

Details

- The 2nd USC (Light) Artillery Regiment (2nd USCA) was made up of nine separate batteries grouped into three nominal battalions of three batteries each. The batteries were usually detached.
  - I Battalion: A, B & C Batteries.
  - II Battalion: D, E & F Batteries.
  - III Battalion: G, H & I Batteries.
- The second raising of the 11th USC Infantry (USCI) was created by converting the 7th USC (Heavy) Artillery into an infantry unit.
- The second raising of the 79th USC Infantry (USCI) was formed from the 1st Kansas Colored Infantry.
- The second raising of the 83rd USC Infantry (USCI) was formed from the 2nd Kansas Colored Infantry.
- The second raising of the 87th USCI was formed from merging the first raisings of the 87th and 96th USCI.
- The second raising of the 113th USCI was formed by merging the first raisings of the 11th, 112th, and 113th USCI.

== Gallery ==
Select USCT Regimental Banners

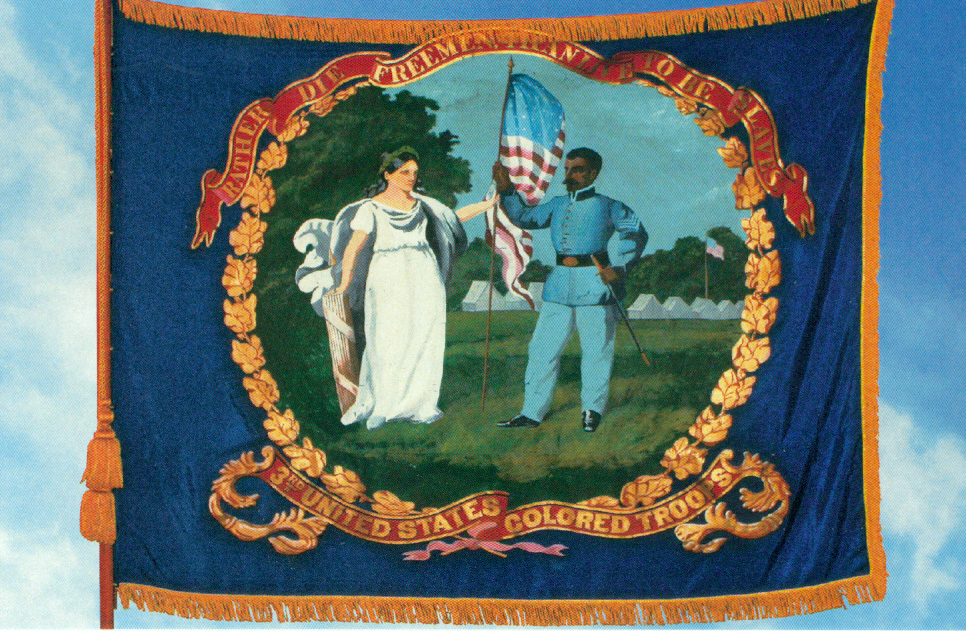
3rd US Colored Troops banner {obverse}

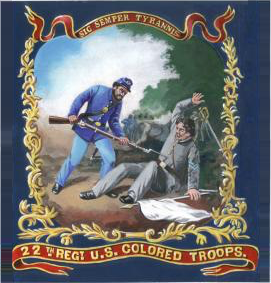
22nd US Colored Troops banner

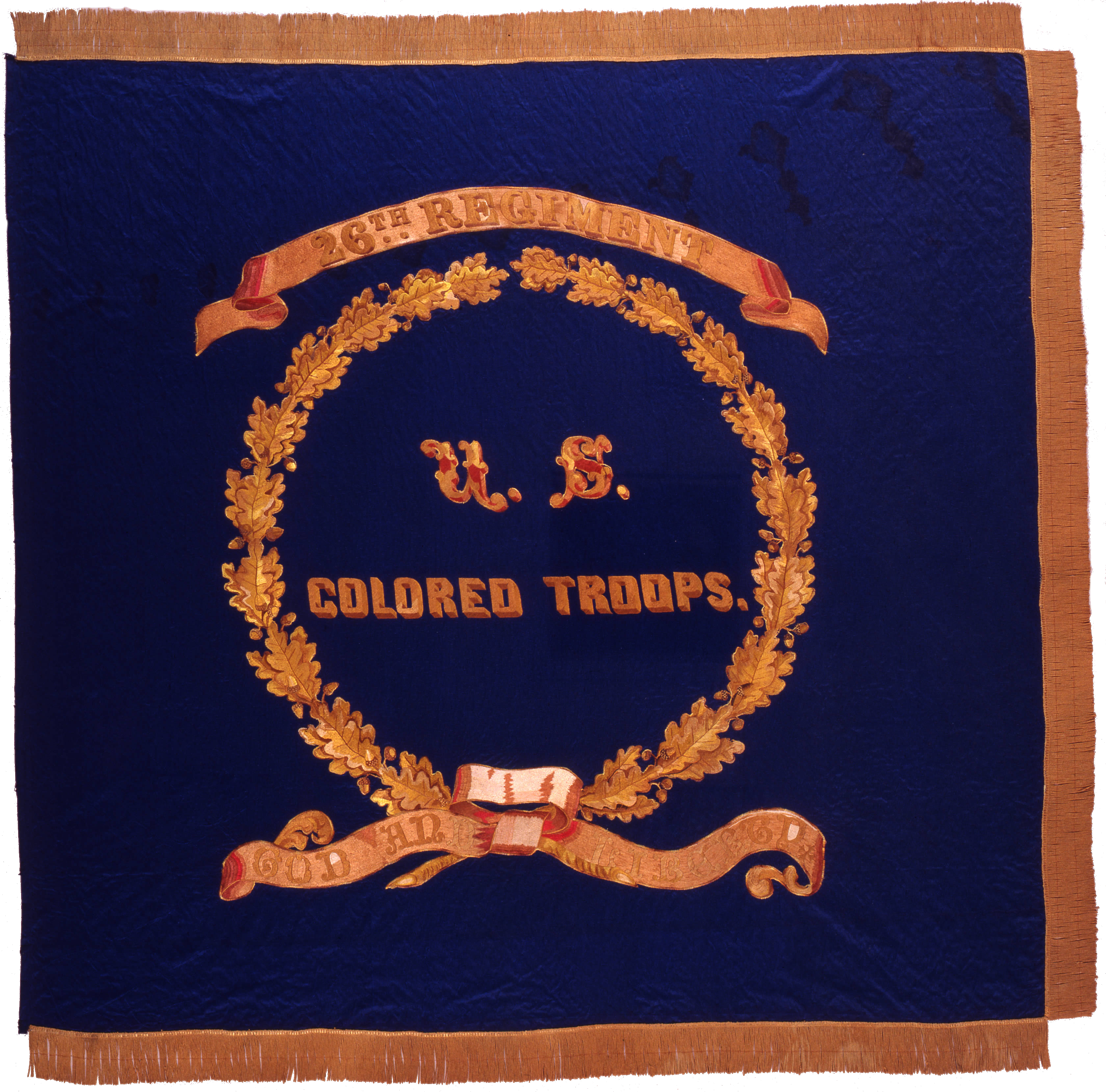
26th US Colored Troops banner

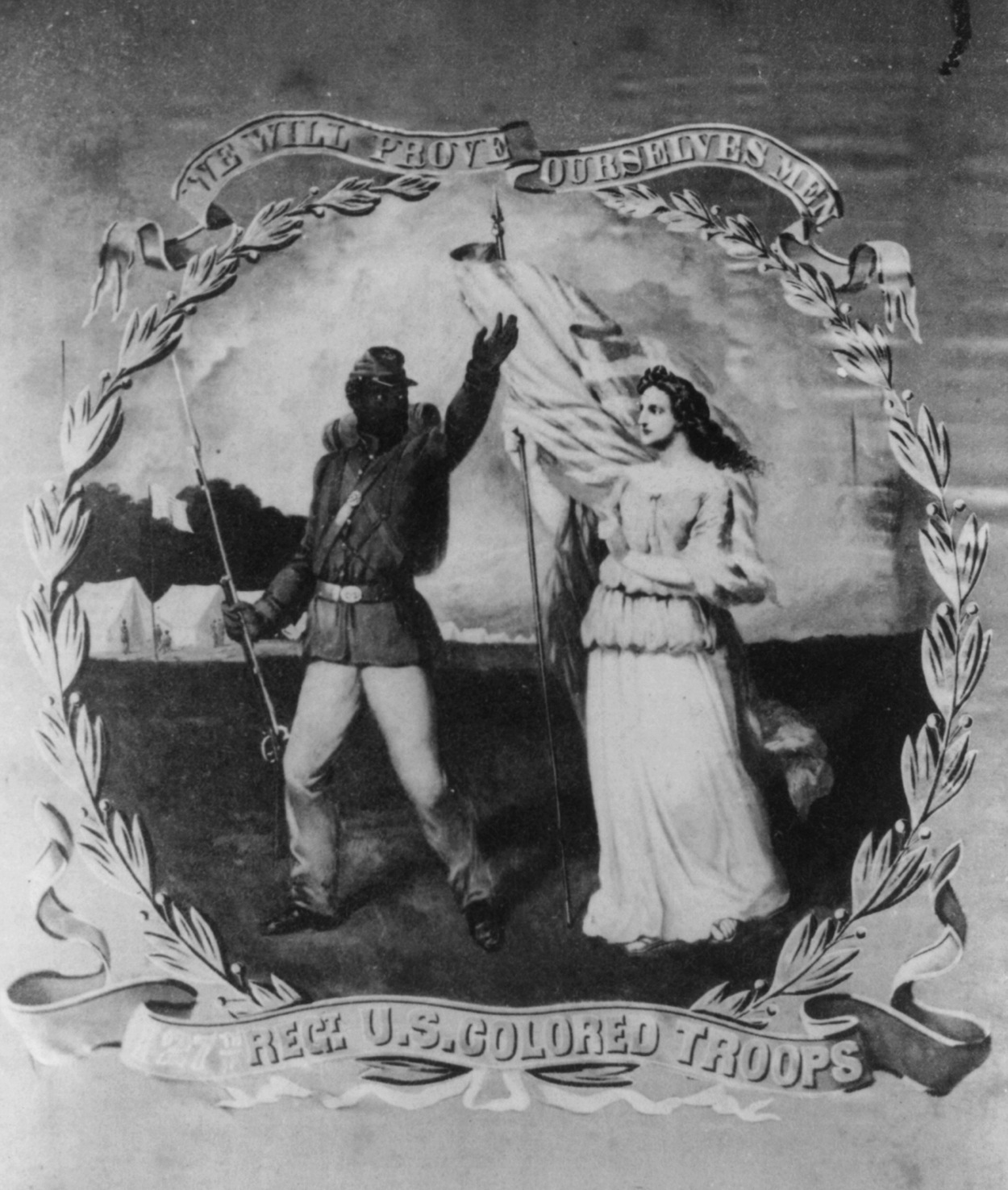
27th US Colored Troops banner

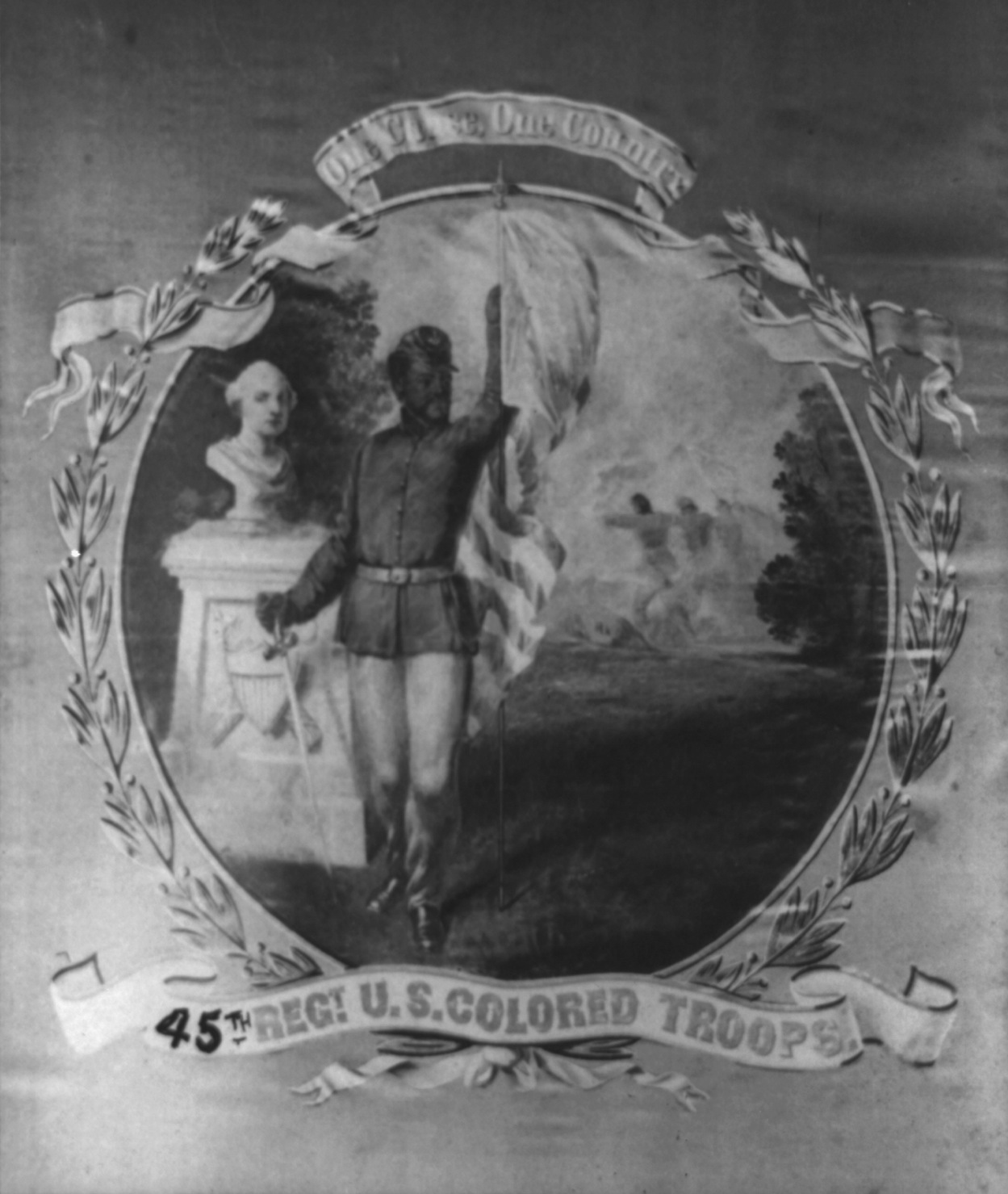
45th US Colored Troops banner

== Notable actions ==
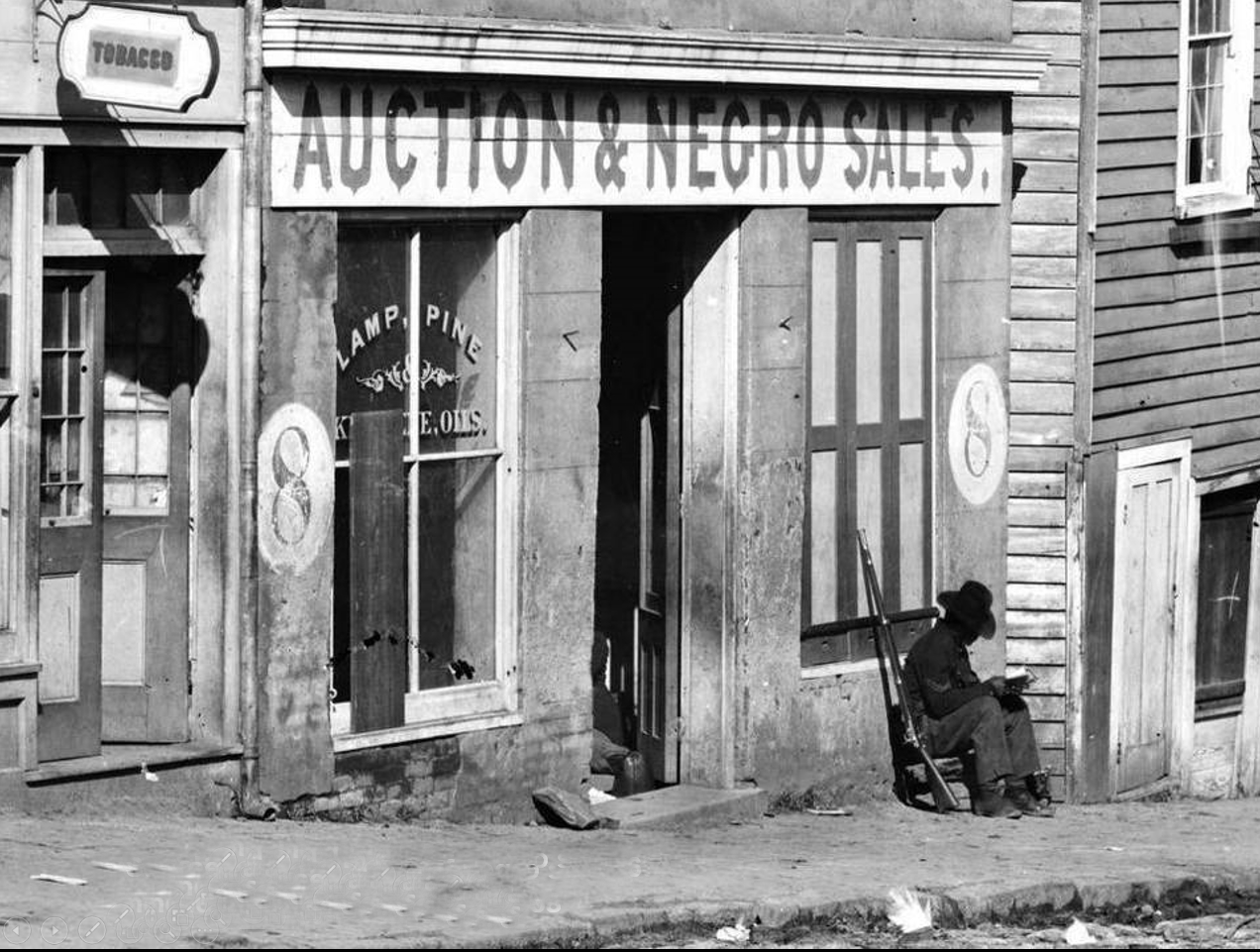
George N. Barnard's photograph of a slave trader's business on Whitehall Street Atlanta, Georgia, 1864. A United States Colored Troop Infantry corporal is sitting by the door.

The first engagement by African-American soldiers against Confederate forces during the Civil War was at the Battle of Island Mound in Bates County, Missouri on October 28–29, 1862. African Americans, mostly escaped slaves, had been recruited into the 1st Kansas Colored Volunteers. They accompanied white troops to Missouri to break up Confederate guerrilla activities based out of Hog Island near Butler, Missouri. Although outnumbered, the African-American soldiers fought valiantly, and the Union forces won the engagement. The conflict was reported by The New York Times and Harper's Weekly. In 2012 the state established the Battle of Island Mound State Historic Site to preserve this area; the eight Union men killed were buried near the battleground.

USCT regiments fought in all theaters of the war, but mainly served as garrison troops in rear areas. The most famous USCT action took place at the Battle of the Crater during the Siege of Petersburg. Regiments of USCT suffered heavy casualties attempting to break through Confederate lines. Other notable engagements include Fort Wagner, one of their first major tests, and the Battle of Nashville.

Colored Troop soldiers were among the first Union forces to enter Richmond, Virginia, after its fall in April 1865. The 41st USCT regiment was among those present at the surrender of the Army of Northern Virginia at Appomattox. Following the war, USCT regiments served among the occupation troops in former Confederate states.

U.S. Army General Ulysses S. Grant praised the competent performance and bearing of the USCT, saying at Vicksburg that:

Negro troops are easier to preserve discipline among than our white troops ... All that have been tried have fought bravely.

— Ulysses S. Grant, at Vicksburg (July 24, 1863).

=== Prisoners of war ===
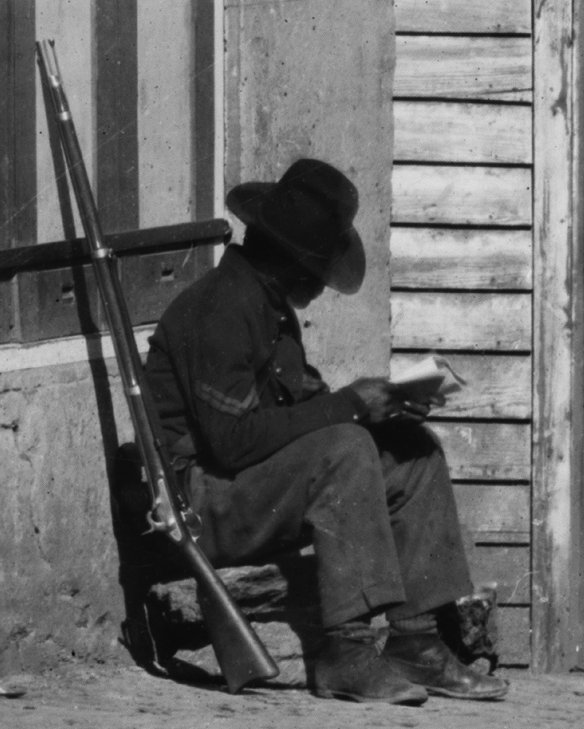
African-American corporal (United States Colored Troops) outside 8 Whitehall Street, Atlanta, a slave auction house; Fall 1864

USCT soldiers suffered extra violence at the hands of Confederate soldiers, who singled them out for mistreatment. They were often the victims of battlefield massacres and atrocities by Confederates, most notably at Fort Pillow in Tennessee, at the Battle of the Crater in Virginia, and at the Battle of Olustee in Florida. They were often murdered when captured by Confederate soldiers, as the Confederacy announced that former slaves fighting for the Union were traitors and would be immediately executed.

The prisoner exchange protocol based on the Dix–Hill Cartel broke down over the Confederacy's position on black prisoners-of-war. The Congress of the Confederate States of America had passed a law on May 1, 1863, stating that white officers commanding black soldiers and blacks captured in uniform would be tried as rebellious slave insurrectionists in civil courts — a capital offense with automatic sentence of death. In practice, USCT soldiers were often murdered by Confederate troops without being taken to court. This law became a stumbling block for prisoner exchange, as the U.S. government in the Lieber Code objected to such discriminatory mistreatment of prisoners of war on basis of ethnicity. The Republican Party's platform during the 1864 presidential election also condemned the Confederacy's mistreatment of black U.S. soldiers. In response to such mistreatment, General Ulysses S. Grant, in a letter to Confederate officer Richard Taylor, urged the Confederates to treat captured black U.S. soldiers humanely and professionally, and not to murder them. He stated the U.S. government's official position, that black U.S. soldiers were sworn military men. The Confederacy had said they were escaped slaves who deserved no better treatment.

== Numbers of colored troops by state, North and South ==
The soldiers are classified by the state where they were enrolled; Northern states often sent agents to enroll formerly enslaved from the South. Many soldiers from Delaware, D.C., Kentucky, Missouri, and West Virginia were formerly enslaved as well. Most of the troops credited to West Virginia, however, were not actually from that state.

North	Number	South	Number
Connecticut	1,764	Alabama	4,969
Colorado Territory	95	Arkansas	5,526
Delaware	954	Florida	1,044
District of Columbia	3,269	Georgia	3,486
Illinois	1,811	Louisiana	24,502
Indiana	1,597	Mississippi	17,869
Iowa	440	North Carolina	5,035
Kansas	2,080	South Carolina	5,462
Kentucky	23,703	Tennessee	20,133
Maine	104	Texas	47
Maryland	8,718	Virginia	5,723
Massachusetts	3,966		
Michigan	1,387	Total from the South	93,796
Minnesota	104		
Missouri	8,344	At large	733
New Hampshire	125	Not accounted for	5,083
New Jersey	1,185		
New York	4,125		
Ohio	5,092		
Pennsylvania	8,612		
Rhode Island	1,837		
Vermont	120		
West Virginia	196		
Wisconsin	155		
Total from the North	79,283		
		Total	178,895

== Postwar ==
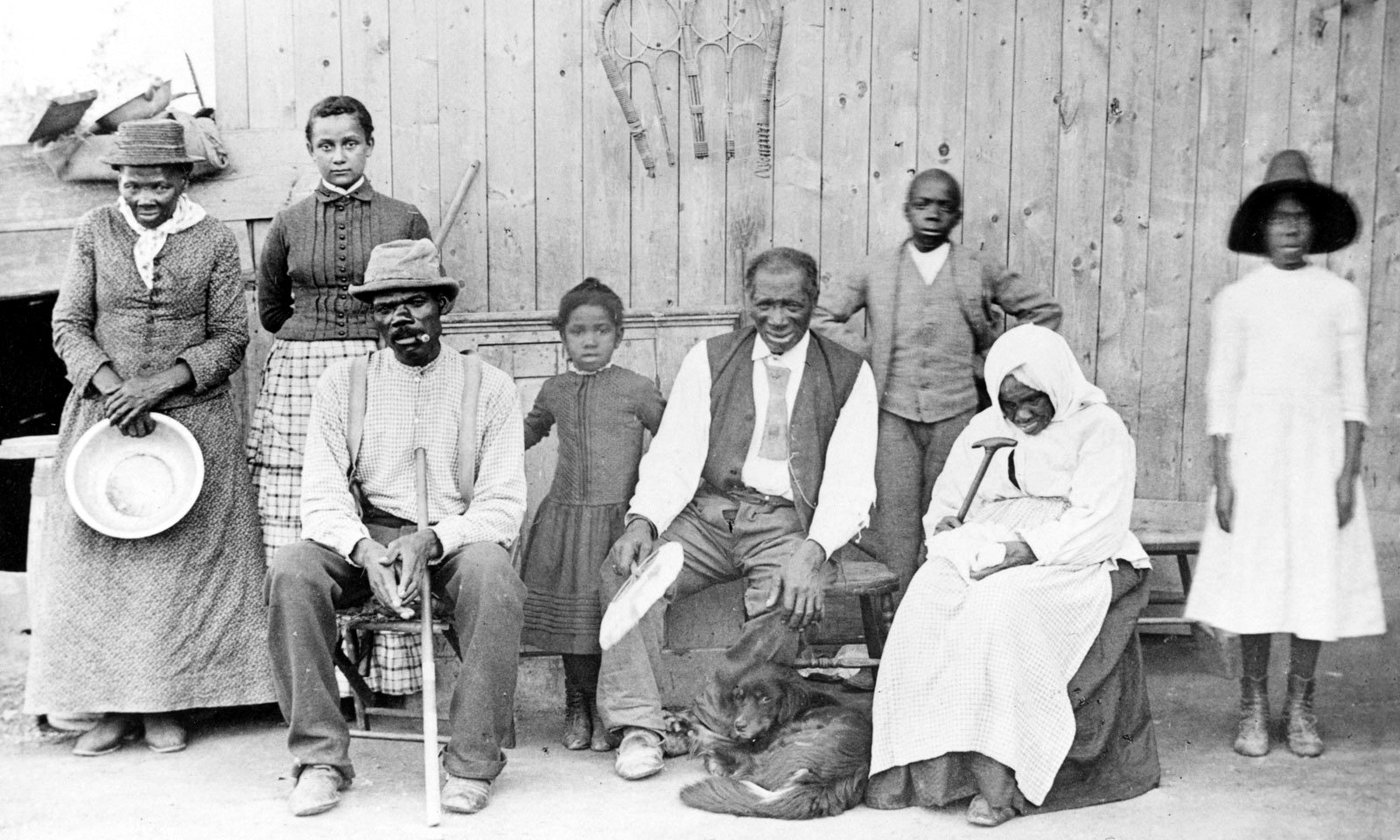
Harriet Tubman with family and ex-slaves; sitting at left is Tubman's second husband, Nelson Davis (8th USCT veteran)

The USCT was disbanded in the fall of 1865. In 1867, the Regular Army was set at ten regiments of cavalry and 45 regiments of infantry. The Army was authorized to raise two regiments of black cavalry (the 9th and 10th Cavalry) and four regiments of black infantry (the 38th, 39th, 40th, and 41st Infantry), who were mostly drawn from USCT veterans. The first draft of the bill that the House Committee on Military Affairs sent to the full chamber on March 7, 1866, did not include a provision for regiments of black cavalry; however, this provision was added by Senator Benjamin Wade prior to the bill's passing. In 1869 the Regular Army was kept at ten regiments of cavalry but cut to 25 regiments of Infantry, reducing the black complement to two regiments (the 24th and 25th (Colored) Infantry).

The two black infantry regiments represented 10 percent of the size of all twenty-five infantry regiments. Similarly, the black cavalry units represented 20 percent of the size of all ten cavalry regiments.

From 1870 to 1898 the strength of the US Army totaled 25,000 service members with black soldiers maintaining their 10 percent representation. USCT soldiers fought in the Indian Wars in the American West, where they became known as the Buffalo Soldiers, reportedly nicknamed by Native Americans who compared their hair to the curly fur of bison.

== Awards ==
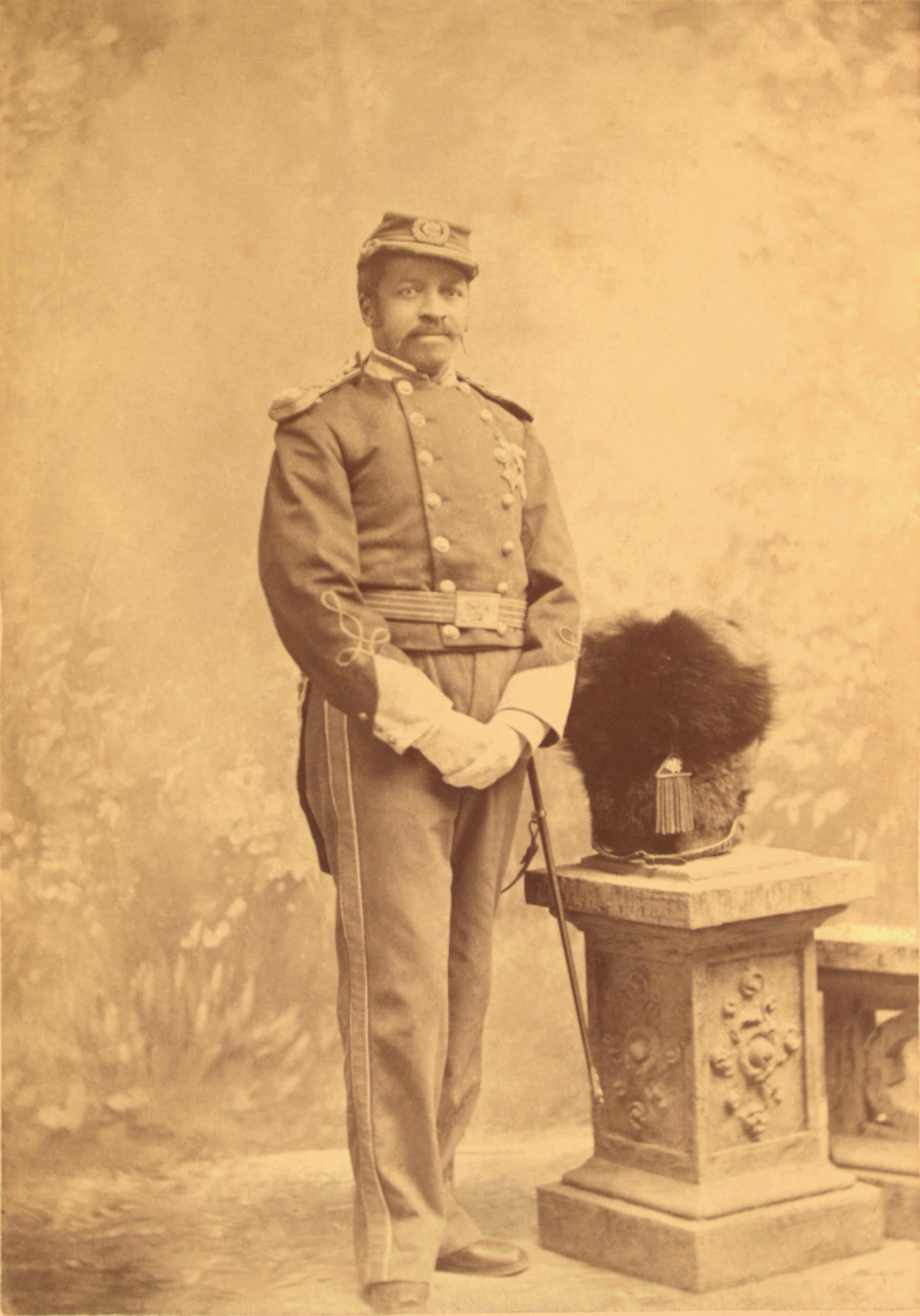
Sgt Major Christian Fleetwood. Civil War, Medal of Honor recipient

=== US Medal of Honor ===
Eighteen African-American USCT soldiers earned the Medal of Honor, the nation's highest award, for service in the war:

- Sergeant William Harvey Carney of the 54th Massachusetts (Colored) Volunteer Infantry was awarded the Medal of Honor for his actions at the Battle of Fort Wagner in July 1863. During the advance, Carney was wounded but still went on. When the color-bearer was shot, Carney grabbed the flagstaff and planted it in the parapet, while the rest of his regiment stormed the fortification. When his regiment was forced to retreat, he was wounded two more times while he carried the colors back to Union lines. He did not relinquish it until he handed it to another soldier of the 54th. Carney received his medal 37 years after the battle.
- Fourteen African-American soldiers, including Sergeant Major Christian Fleetwood and Sergeant Alfred B. Hilton (mortally wounded) of the 4th USCT, were awarded the Medal of Honor for their actions at the Battle of Chaffin's Farm in September 1864, during the campaign to take Petersburg.
- Corporal Andrew Jackson Smith of the 55th Massachusetts (Colored) Volunteer Infantry was recommended for the Medal of Honor for his actions at the Battle of Honey Hill in November 1864. Smith prevented the regimental colors from falling into enemy hands after the color sergeant was killed. Due to a lack of official records, he was not awarded the medal until 2001.

=== The Butler Award ===
Soldiers who fought in the Army of the James were eligible for the Butler Medal, commissioned by that army's commander, Maj. Gen. Benjamin Butler. When several slaves escaped to Butler's lines in 1861, at Fort Monroe in Virginia, Butler was the first to declare any refugee slaves as contraband, and refused to return them to slaveholders, a standard that slowly became an unofficial policy throughout the Union Army. Their owner, a Confederate colonel, came to Butler under a flag of truce and demanded that they be returned to him under the Fugitive Slave Act of 1850. Butler informed him that since Virginia claimed to have left the Union, the Fugitive Slave Law no longer applied, declaring the slaves to be contraband of war.

== Legacy and modern views ==
The historian Steven Hahn proposes that when slaves organized themselves and worked with the Union Army during the American Civil War, including as some regiments of the USCT, their actions comprised a slave rebellion that dwarfed all other slave revolts. The African American Civil War Memorial Museum helps to preserve pertinent information from the period.

U.S. Colored Troops

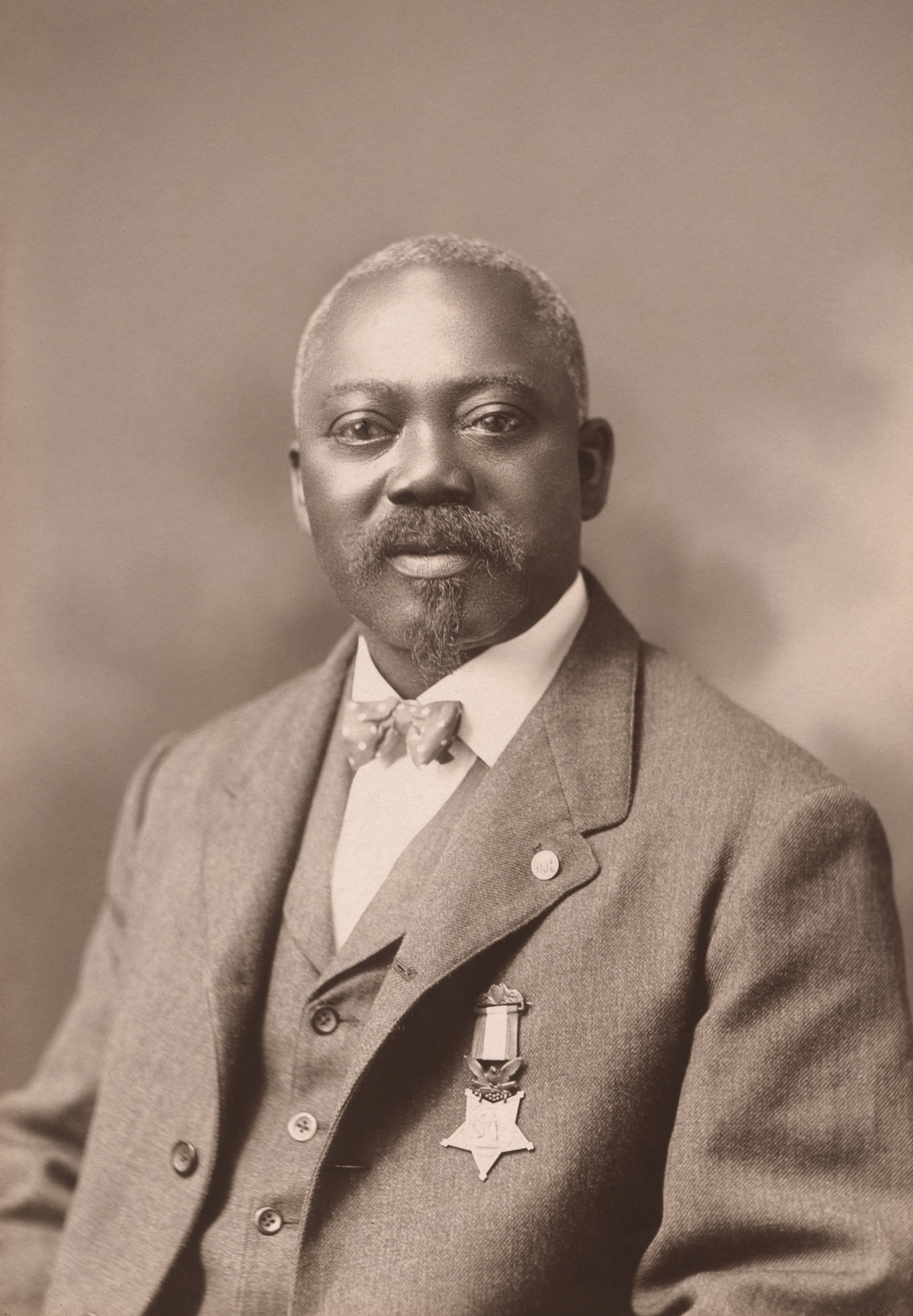
Sgt. William Harvey Carney Medal of Honor recipient

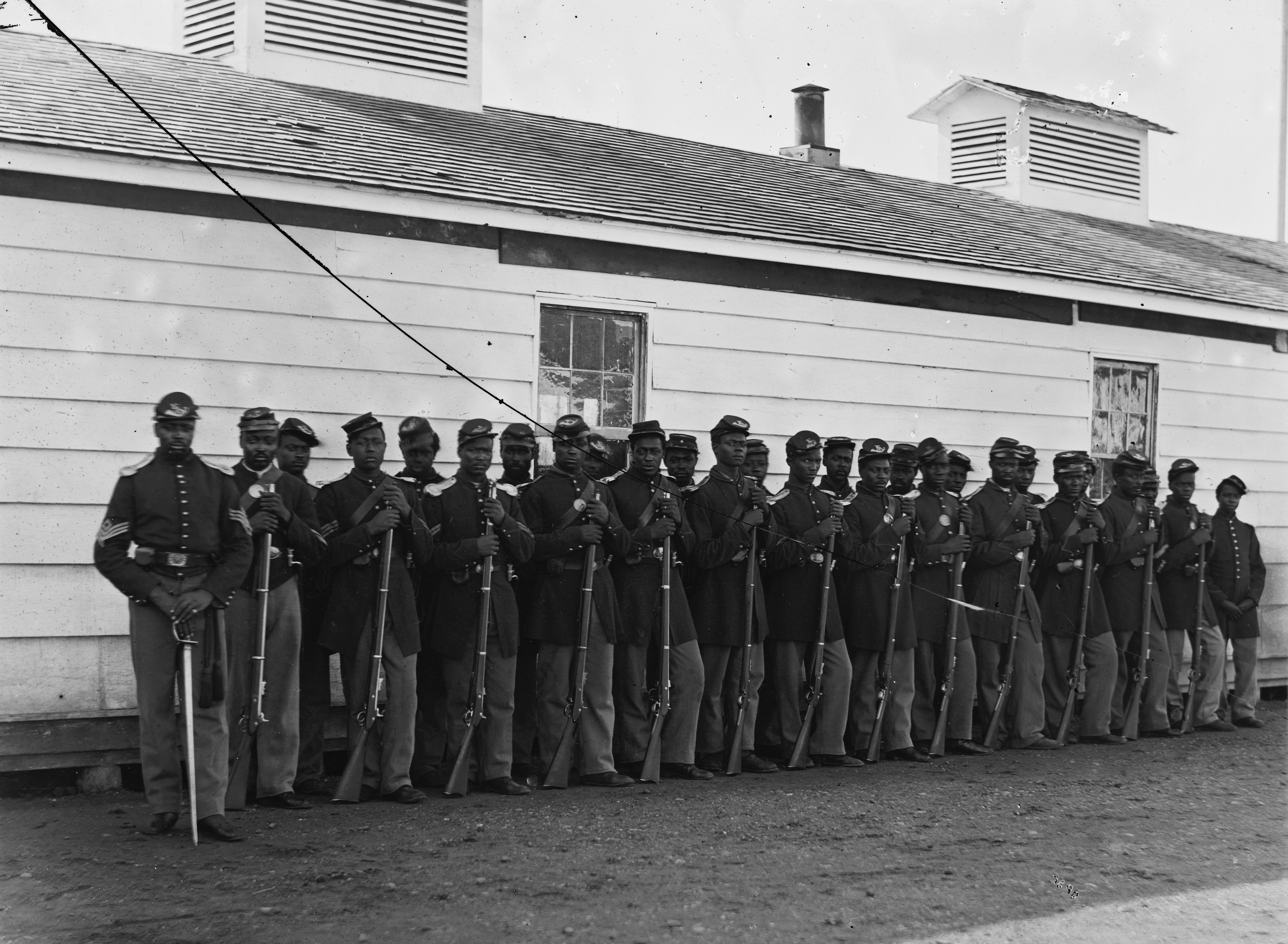
Company E, 4th US Colored Troops at Fort Lincoln, November 17, 1865 (from Library of Congress)

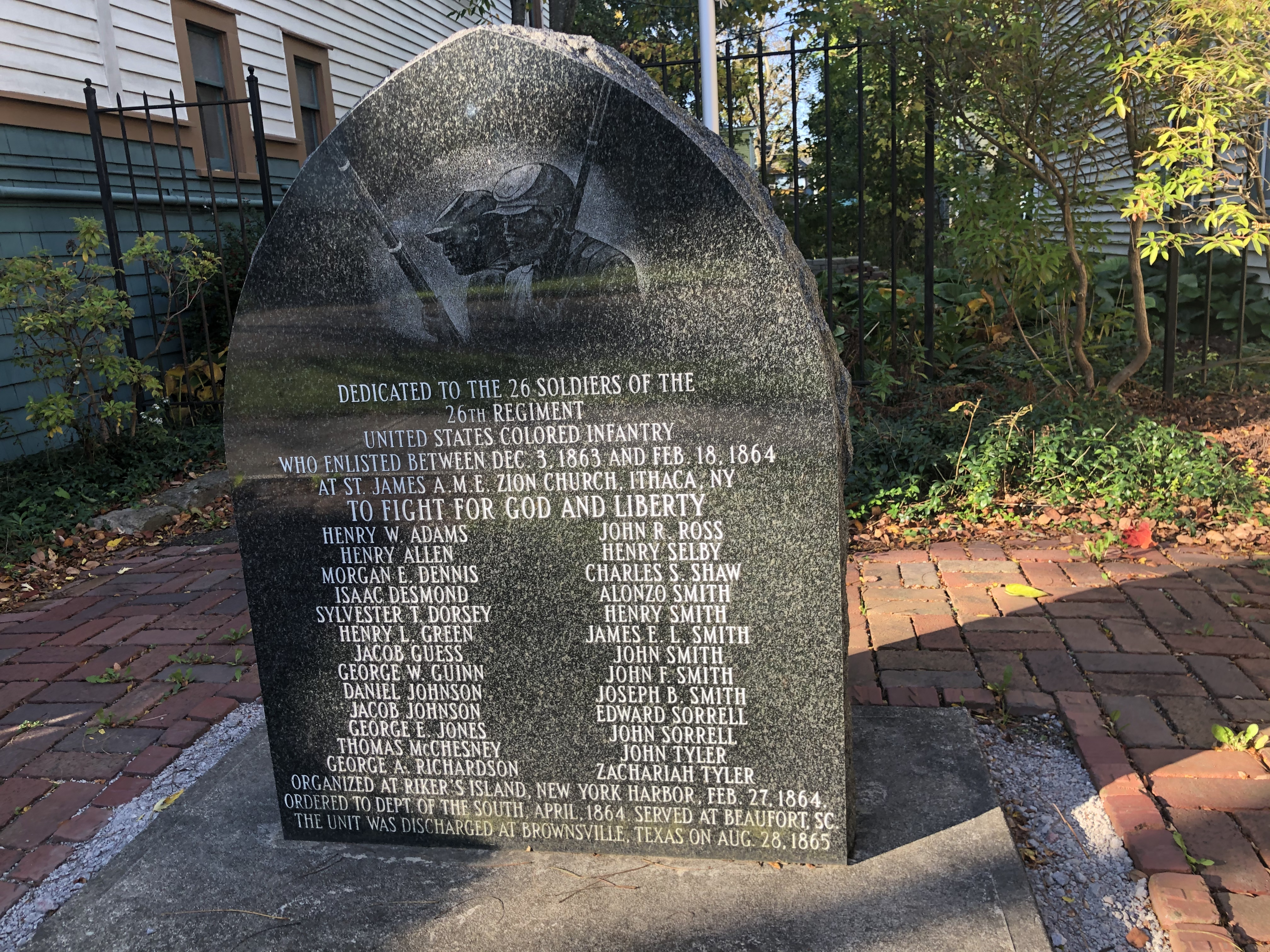
Marker dedicated to the 26th Regiment of U.S. Colored Infantry in Ithaca, New York

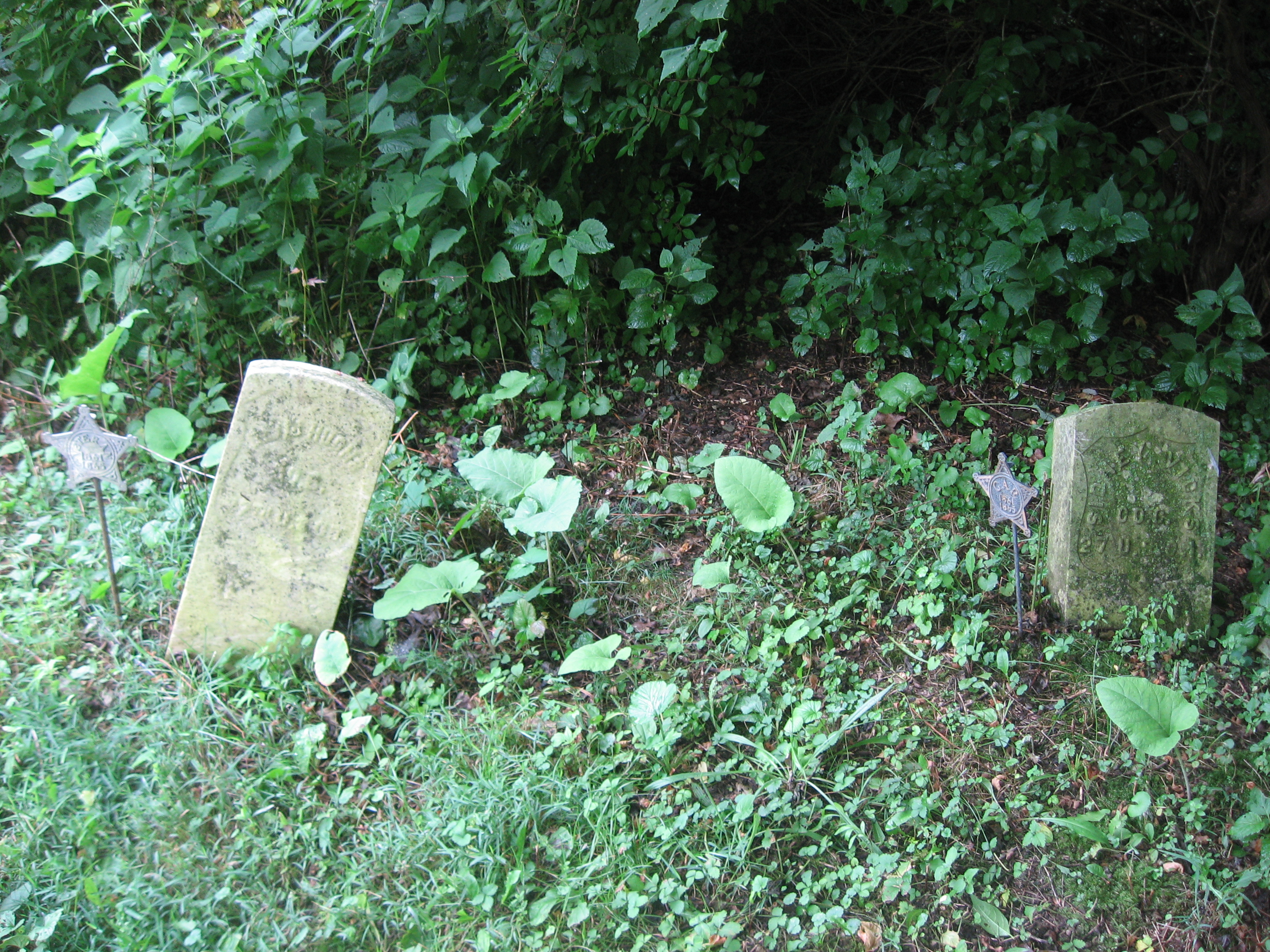
USCT Graves near Piqua, Ohio

=== Tributes ===
- In 1924, the Grand Army of the Republic unveiled the Colored Soldiers Monument in Frankfort, Kentucky.
- In September 1996, a national celebration in commemoration of the service of the United States Colored Troops was held.
- The African American Civil War Memorial (1997), featuring Spirit of Freedom by sculptor Ed Hamilton, was erected at the corner of Vermont Avenue and U Street NW in the capital, Washington, D.C. It is administered by the National Park Service.
- In 1999 the African American Civil War Museum opened nearby.
- In July 2011, the African American Civil War Museum celebrated a grand opening of its new facility at 1925 Vermont Avenue Northwest, Washington, D.C., just across the street from the memorial.

=== Other ===
The motion picture Glory, starring Denzel Washington, Morgan Freeman, and Matthew Broderick, portrayed the African-American soldiers of the 54th Massachusetts Volunteer Infantry Regiment. It showed their training and participation in several battles, including the second assault on Fort Wagner on July 18, 1863. Although the 54th was not a USCT regiment, but a state volunteer regiment originally raised from free blacks in Boston, similar to the 1st and 2nd Kansas Colored Infantry, the film portrays the experiences and hardships of African-American troops during the Civil War. Richard Walter Thomas, black scholar of race relations, observed that the relationship between white and black soldiers in the Civil War was an instance of what he calls "the other tradition": "... after sharing the horrors of war with their black comrades in arms, many white officers experienced deep and dramatic transformations in their attitudes toward blacks."

== Similar units ==
- 92nd Infantry Division (United States)
- 93d Infantry Division (United States)
- 366th Infantry Regiment (United States)
- 369th Infantry Regiment (United States)
- 761st Tank Battalion (United States)
- 1st Louisiana Native Guard (CSA)

== See also ==
- Corps of Colonial Marines
- Ethiopian Regiment
- List of United States Colored Troops Civil War units
- Military history of African Americans
- Military history of African Americans in the American Civil War
- Marching Song of the First Arkansas
- Native Americans in the American Civil War
