= Charles Veale =

American Union Army soldier

- Born: c. 1838; Portsmouth, Virginia
- Died: July 27, 1872 (aged 33–34)
- Burial place: Hampton National Cemetery, Hampton, Virginia
- Military career
- Allegiance: United States; Union
- Branch: United States Army; Union Army
- Rank: Private
- Unit: 4th Regiment United States Colored Infantry
- Conflicts: American Civil War Battle of Chaffin's Farm
- Awards: Medal of Honor

Charles Veale or Veal was an African American Union Army soldier during the American Civil War and a recipient of America's highest military decoration—the Medal of Honor—for his actions at the Battle of Chaffin's Farm.

== Biography ==
Veale joined the Army in Portsmouth, Virginia, enlisting as a private in Company D of the 4th Regiment United States Colored Infantry. He was promoted to corporal on August 28, 1863. Before the war he worked as a fireman.

On September 29, 1864, his unit participated in a charge during the Battle of Chaffin's Farm on the outskirts of the Confederate capital of Richmond, Virginia. Among the charging soldiers was Sergeant Alfred B. Hilton, the bearer of two flags, one of which had been seized from a wounded sergeant. When Hilton himself was wounded, Veale and another soldier, Sergeant Major Christian Fleetwood, each grabbed a flag from him before the colors could touch the ground. Now carrying the blue regimental flag, Veale continued in the fight through heavy enemy fire. General Benjamin Butler witnessed these events and desired to promote Veale to sergeant on the spot. He was officially promoted on November 12, 1864.

For their actions during the battle, Fleetwood, Hilton, and Veale were each issued the Medal of Honor just over six months later, on April 6, 1865. He also received another medal for valor which was awarded to colored troops, the Butler Medal.

Charles Veale was buried in Hampton National Cemetery, Hampton, Virginia.

== Medal of Honor citation ==
Although his name is spelled Veale his name was spelled "Charles Veal" on the citation.

Rank and organization: Private, Company D, 4th U.S. Colored Troops. Place and date: At Chapins Farm, Va., September 29, 1864. Entered service at: Portsmouth, Va. Birth: Portsmouth Va. Date of issue: April 6, 1865.

Citation:

Seized the national colors after 2 color bearers had been shot down close to the enemy's works, and bore them through the remainder of the battle.

== See also ==
- List of Medal of Honor recipients
- List of American Civil War Medal of Honor recipients: T–Z
- List of African-American Medal of Honor recipients
