= Sara Iredell Fleetwood =

African American nurse and teacher

- Born: Sara Louise Iredell; April 1849; St. Louis, Missouri
- Died: February 1, 1908 (aged 58); Washington, D. C.
- Other names: Sara L. Iredell, Sarah Iredell, Sarah Fleetwood
- Occupation(s): teacher, community worker, nurse
- Years active: 1860–1908

Sara Iredell Fleetwood (1849–1908) was an American clubwoman and teacher. She was involved in the movement of black women into professional nursing, graduating as one of the first nurses from Howard University's Freedman's Hospital School of Nursing. She became the nursing superintendent at Freedman's, organized the Freedmen's Nursing Association and served as the first African American woman on the nurse's examining board of the District of Columbia.

== Early life ==
Sara Louise Iredell was born in April 1849 in St. Louis, Missouri to Elizabeth Susan (née Webb) and Geoffrey George Iredell. Her father was originally from Edenton, North Carolina, and was the son of a slave who had been emancipated. At the time Sarah and her sister Laura (1850–1909) were born, he was operating a barber shop in St. Louis. Her mother, originally from Philadelphia, Pennsylvania was the sister of Frank J. Webb, and they were the children of abolitionists Louisa (née Burr), illegitimate daughter of Aaron Burr, and Francis Webb. During Iredell's childhood, the family moved to Philadelphia making their home with their Webb cousins. Between 1856 and 1858, she attended Oberlin College as a pupil-teacher.

== Career ==
After her graduation from Oberlin, Iredell moved back to Philadelphia and began her career teaching in public schools. In 1863, she became a founding member of the Ladies Union Association, serving as the organization's secretary. The Ladies Union was created to fund raise and provide assistance to African American soldiers who were either sick or wounded. In 1866, Iredell worked as a pupil-teacher at the Institute for Colored Youth, completing her training in 1867. She then taught from 1867 to 1868 at the Roberts Vaux School before moving to teach in the public school system of Frederick, Maryland. Because of low pay and the treatment black teachers received, she left Maryland and began working as a teacher in Washington, D. C.

In Washington, Iredell became involved in the National Association for the Relief of Destitute Colored Women and Children. She met and married Medal of Honor recipient Christian Fleetwood in 1869 and the couple subsequently had a daughter, Edith. They were very involved with the prominent African American professional community hosting literary salons and entertaining their guests with theatrical and musical performances. In 1892, Fleetwood was one of the nine co-founders of the Colored Women's League of Washington, an organization which focused on issues faced by black women. She spoke at various functions addressing issues like childcare and parenting training, establishment of nurseries for working women, and sanitation. In 1898, she and Anna Evans Murray attended the Congress of Mothers as representatives of the Colored Women's League.

In 1893, Fleetwood enrolled in the first class of nurses admitted to Howard University's Freedman's Hospital School of Nursing, studying under Daniel Hale Williams. That same year, she and her cousin, Evelyn D. Shaw organized relief efforts to feed and house those impacted by the Panic of 1893. She graduated from Freedman's in 1896 and initially became a private nurse in Washington. In February 1901, when the previous nursing supervisor resigned, Fleetwood was appointed by Dr. Austin M. Curtis as the replacement supervisor for the training school. She took a national civil service examination to qualify for the post outscoring applicants from throughout the country. Her appointment marked the first time a black supervisor held the post. In August of the same year, she was confirmed as supervisor by the chief surgeon, Dr. William A. Warfield, who reappointed her and gave her the title, Directoress of Nurses. She remained the director until 1904, when she resigned from the post.

Fleetwood organized the Freedmen’s Nurses Association and attended the national convention of the Nurses Association Alumni as the association's delegate in 1904. In 1907, when the examining board for graduate nurses was established in Washington, D. C. she was selected as the first black representative on the board by the Graduate Nurses' Association. When her term expired in June of that same year, she was not reappointed and despite protests by the commissioners, no other African American representative was appointed to the board.

== Death and legacy ==
Fleetwood died on February 1, 1908, in Washington, D. C. from complications of diabetes. She and her husband's papers make up the Christian A. Fleetwood Papers, which were donated to the Library of Congress in 1947. The site for the house in which the couple resided, at 319 U Street NW, in the LeDroit Park Historic District of Washington, D. C. is part of the African American Heritage Trail in the capital city and is identified by a historic marker.
