= William H. Appleton =

American soldier who received the Medal of Honor

- Born: March 24, 1843; Chichester, New Hampshire
- Died: September 9, 1912 (aged 69)
- Military career
- Allegiance: United States of America; Union
- Branch: United States Army; Union Army
- Service years: 1861 - 1866
- Rank: Captain; Brevet Major
- Units: 2nd New Hampshire Infantry; 4th U.S. Colored Infantry
- Conflicts: American Civil War: First Battle of Bull Run; Peninsula Campaign; Second Battle of Bull Run; Battle of Fredericksburg; Battle of Gettysburg; Second Battle of Petersburg; Battle of Chaffin's Farm; First Battle of Fort Fisher; Battle of Wilmington
- Awards: Medal of Honor

William H. Appleton (March 24, 1843 – September 9, 1912) was an American soldier who received the Medal of Honor for valor during the American Civil War.

== Biography ==
William was born on March 24, 1843, in Chichester, New Hampshire, where his father was a wheelwright. Bill enlisted in the Union Army in May 1861 at the age of 19 and was assigned to Company I of the 2nd New Hampshire Infantry. Bill fought at First Manassas, the Peninsula Campaign, Second Manassas, Fredericksburg, and Gettysburg before joining a newly formed unit, the 4th US Colored Infantry. This unit was formed in Baltimore, Maryland, on July 15, 1863, and William Appleton joined Company H as a second lieutenant in August that same year. It was his actions at the Second Battle of Petersburg that would earn him a promotion and the Medal of Honor.

William Appleton was able to lead the charge and was unscathed at the end. One other officer was killed, along with five others wounded in the same battle. Bill was promoted to captain and moved to command Company E, where they would go on to fight at and capture Fort Fisher in January 1865. Appleton and the 4th US Colored Infantry were mustered out of service in May 1866 and little else is known about his post service life is known. Bill was brevet promoted to Major before his end of service and Bill received his Medal of Honor on February 18, 1891. William Appleton died on September 9, 1912, at the age of 69 and is buried in the Evergreen Cemetery in Pembroke, New Hampshire.

== Medal of Honor citation ==
Citation:

The first man of the Eighteenth Corps to enter the enemy's works at Petersburg, Va., 15 June 1864. Valiant service in a desperate assault at New Market Heights, Va., inspiring the Union troops by his example of steady courage.

== See also ==
- List of American Civil War Medal of Honor recipients: A-F
