= 4th United States Colored Infantry Regiment =

Military unit on the Union side during the American Civil War

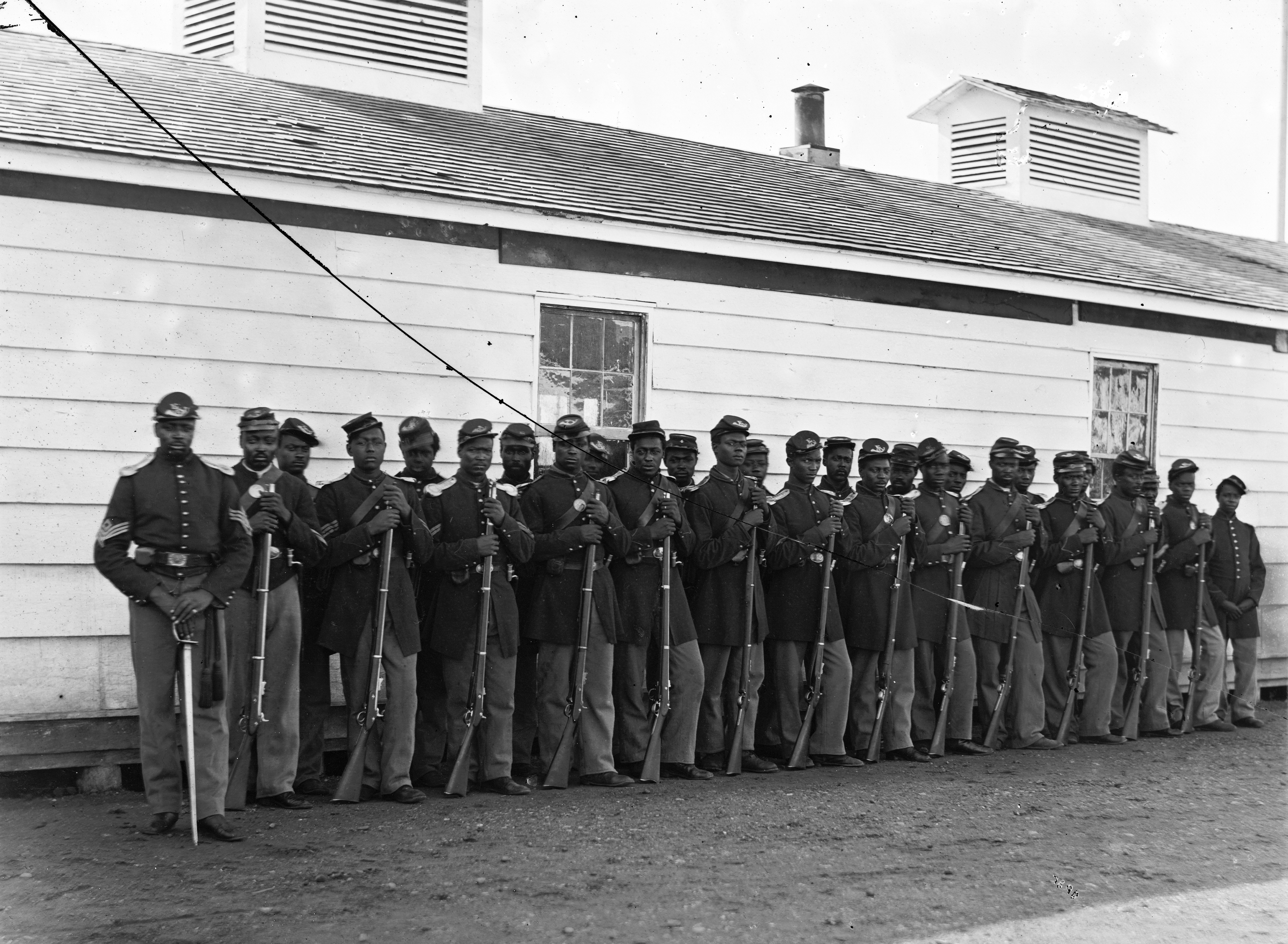
- Company E, 4th US Colored Troops, Fort Lincoln, 11-17-1865. Library of Congress link at
- Active: July 15, 1863 – May 4, 1866
- Country: United States
- Branch: Army
- Type: Infantry
- Part of: 2nd Brigade, XVIII Corps (1863 – April 1864) 2nd Brigade, Hincks' Colored Division, XVIII Corps (April 1864 – June 1864); 2nd Brigade, 3rd Division, XVIII Corps (June 1864 – December 1864); 2nd Brigade, 1st Division, XXV Corps (December 1864 – January 1865); 2nd Brigade, 3rd Division, XXV Corps (January 1865 – March 1865) 2nd Brigade, 3rd Division, X Corps (March 1865 – August 1865)

The 4th United States Colored Infantry Regiment was an African-American unit of the Union Army during the American Civil War. A part of the United States Colored Troops, the regiment saw action in Virginia and North Carolina, taking part in the Richmond-Petersburg Campaign, the capture of Fort Fisher and Wilmington, North Carolina, and the Carolinas campaign.

== History ==
Organized at Baltimore, Maryland, from July 15 to September 1, 1863, the 4th Regiment was first sent to Fort Monroe, Virginia, on October 1 before moving to Yorktown, Virginia. As part of the XVIII Corps, the unit participated in several expeditions and engagements: an expedition to Mathews County from October 4 to October 9, 1863, Wistar's Expedition against Richmond from February 6 to February 8, 1864, action at New Kent Court House on February 8, an expedition to Bottom's Bridge in aid of Brigadier General Hugh Judson Kilpatrick's cavalry from March 1 to March 4, an expedition into King and Queen County from March 9 to March 12, and an expedition into Mathews and Middlesex Counties from March 17 to March 21.

In May 1864, the 4th left Yorktown and took part in Brigadier General Benjamin F. Butler's operations on the south side of the James River and against Petersburg and Richmond, Virginia. The regiment saw action in a skirmish at Bermuda Hundred on May 4 and served the rest of Butler's campaign at Spring Hill on the Appomattox River. While there, the men of the unit built Fort Converse and defended the fort against an attack on May 20.9 From June to December 1864, the 4th Regiment participated in the Richmond-Petersburg Campaign. At Petersburg, the unit was involved in the Second Battle of Petersburg from June 15 to June 18 and the Battle of the Crater on July 30. Later, the 4th moved towards Richmond and took part in an engagement at Dutch Gap on September 7, the Battle of Chaffin's Farm from September 28 to September 30, and the Battle of Fair Oaks on October 27 and October 28. Three men of the regiment received the Medal of Honor for their actions at Chaffin's Farm: Christian Fleetwood, Alfred B. Hilton, and Charles Veale.

In December the unit was assigned to the newly formed XXV Corps and took part in the failed attack on Fort Fisher, North Carolina, from December 7 to December 27, 1864, and the successful Second Battle of Fort Fisher from January 7 to January 15, 1865, where the regiment was involved in the assault and capture of the fort. The 4th then participated in several other engagements in the area, Sugar Loaf Hill on January 19, Sugar Loaf Battery on February 11, the Battle of Wilmington at Fort Anderson from February 18 to February 20, and the capture of Wilmington and action at Northeast Ferry on February 22, 1865.

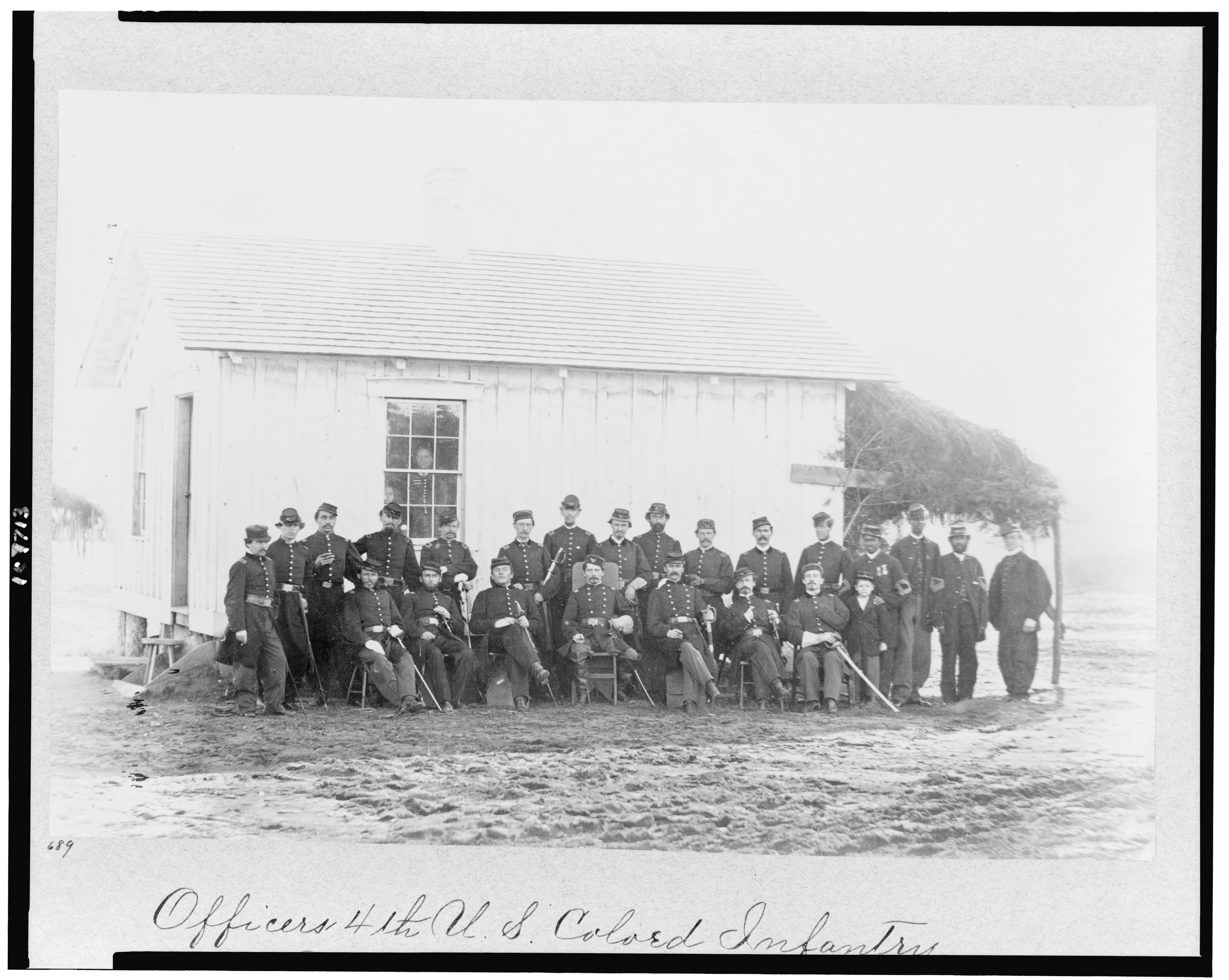
"Officers 4th U.S. Colo(r)ed Infantry, Fort Slocum, April, 1865"; standing 4th from right is Sgt Major Christian Fleetwood wearing the Medal of Honor and the Butler Medal

In March 1865, the 4th Regiment was reassigned to the X Corps and took part in General William Tecumseh Sherman's Carolinas campaign. The unit saw action during the advance on Goldsboro, North Carolina, starting on March 6 and occupied Goldsboro after its capture on March 21. The regiment saw further action at Cox's Bridge on March 23 and March 24 and participated in the advance on Raleigh, North Carolina, starting on April 9 and the occupation of Raleigh after the city's fall on April 14. With the end of the war at hand, the men of the 4th witnessed the surrender of Confederate General Joseph E. Johnston and his army at Bennett Place, North Carolina, on April 26, 1865. The unit served out the rest of its term in the Department of North Carolina.

The 4th was mustered out on May 4, 1866, after about three years of existence. The regiment lost a total of 292 men during its service; three officers and 102 enlisted men were killed or mortally wounded and one officer and 186 enlisted men died of disease.

== Members ==
- William H. Appleton (1843–1912), CMOH. Commissioned 2nd Lieutenant of the 4th United States Colored Infantry Regiment, August 3, 1863.
- J. Murray Hoag (1843–1917), commissioned 2nd Lieutenant of the 4th United States Colored Infantry Regiment, 1863.

== See also ==
- List of United States Colored Troops Civil War Units
