= Christian Abraham Fleetwood =

United States Army Medal of Honor recipient

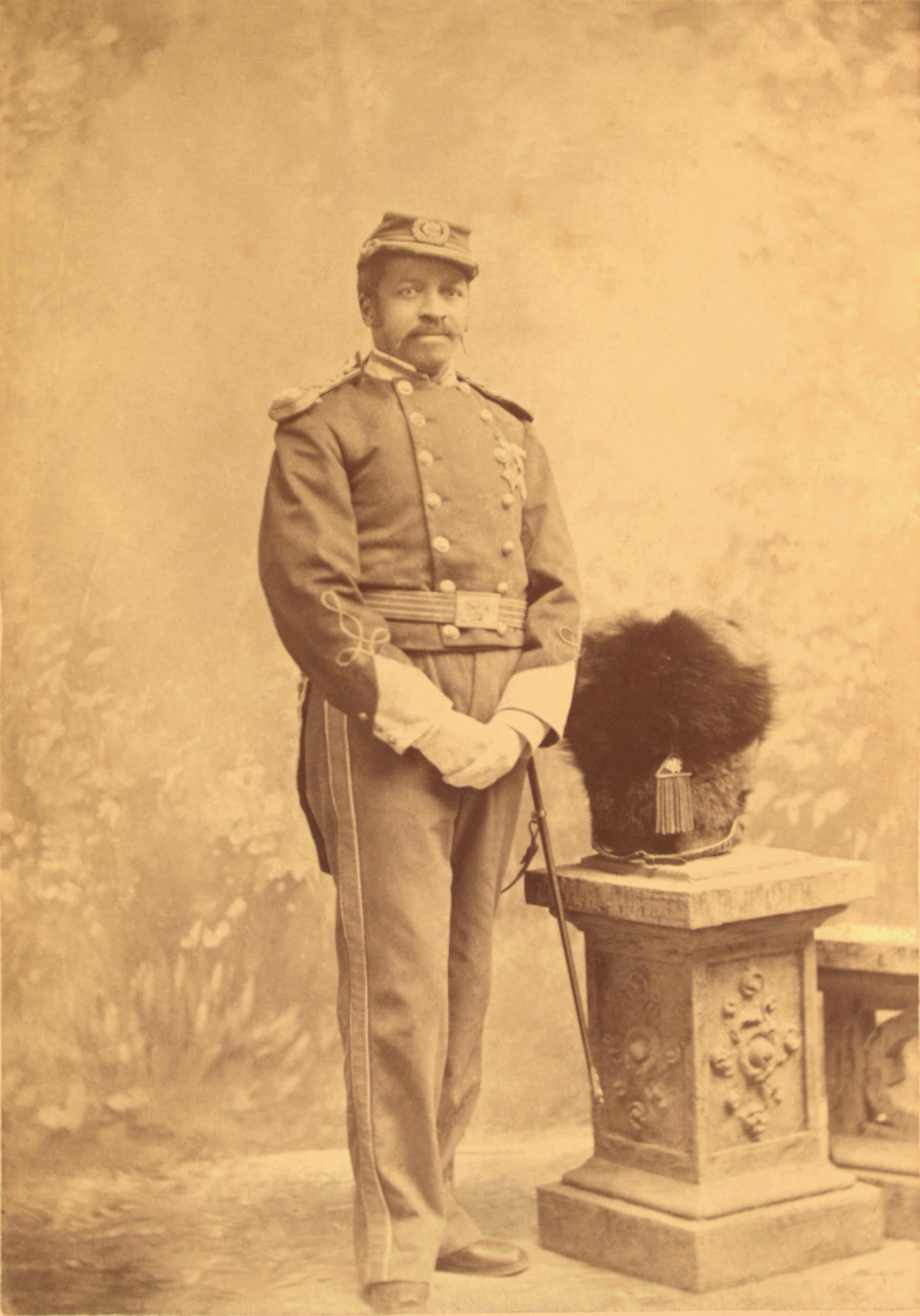
- Christian Fleetwood, as Captain of the Washington Cadet Corps (WCC)
- Born: July 21, 1840; Baltimore, Maryland
- Died: September 28, 1914 (aged 74); Washington, D.C.
- Burial place: Columbian Harmony Cemetery, Washington, D.C.
- Military career
- Allegiance: United States of America; Union
- Branch: U.S. Army (Union Army); Washington Colored National Guard aka Washington Cadet Corps; D.C. National Guard
- Service years: 1863–1866; 1880-1892
- Rank: Sergeant Major (Army) Major (National Guard)
- Units: 4th Regiment United States Colored Troops, 6th, later 7th BN D.C. National Guard
- Commands: Washington Cadet Corps (6th, later 7th BN, D.C. National Guard)
- Conflicts: American Civil War: Battle of Chaffin's Farm
- Awards: Medal of Honor; Butler Medal
- Other work: editor, musician, and politician

Christian Abraham Fleetwood (July 21, 1840 – September 28, 1914), was an African American non-commissioned officer in the United States Army, a commissioned officer in the D.C. National Guard, an editor, a musician, and a government official. He received the Medal of Honor for his actions during the American Civil War. He wrote "The Negro As a Soldier" for the Negro Congress at the Cotton States and International Exposition in Atlanta, Georgia held in November 1895.

== Pre-war life ==
=== Early life ===
Fleetwood was born in Baltimore on July 21, 1840, the son of Charles and Anna Maria Fleetwood; both were free persons of color. He established and published The Lyceum Observer, said to be the first newspaper in the Upper South to be owned and operated by an African American.

=== Education ===
He received his early education in the home of a wealthy sugar merchant and chairman of Baltimore's Chamber of Commerce, John C. Brunes, and his wife. The latter treated Fleetwood like her son and taught him to read and write. He continued his education at the Maryland State Colonization Society, went briefly to Liberia and Sierra Leone, and graduated in 1860 from Ashmun Institute (later known as Lincoln University) in Oxford, Pennsylvania.

== Civil War ==
=== Enlistment ===
When the American Civil War disrupted travel by ship to Liberia, Fleetwood went to Baltimore's Camp Birney formerly called Camp Belger and enlisted into Company G of the 4th Regiment United States Colored Infantry, Union Army, on August 11 or August 17, 1863. Due to his educated background, Fleetwood was given the rank of sergeant upon enlistment and was promoted to sergeant major on August 19. "Good manners, and legible handwriting were among the chief qualifications for a sergeant major," according to historian William Dobak. His regiment, assigned to the 3rd Division, saw service with the 10th, 18th, and 25th Army Corps in campaigns in North Carolina and Virginia, particularly on July 16, 1864, in the Battle of Petersburg and on September 29–30, 1864, in the Battle of Chaffin's Farm.

=== Battle of Chaffin's Farm and Medal of Honor ===
On September 29, 1864, the 3rd Division, including Fleetwood's regiment, participated in the Battle of Chaffin's Farm on the outskirts of the Confederate capital of Richmond, Virginia. During the 4th Regiment's charge on the enemy fortifications, Fleetwood supervised the unit's left flank. Among the charging soldiers was Sergeant Alfred B. Hilton, the bearer of two flags, one of which had been seized from a wounded sergeant. When Hilton himself was wounded, Fleetwood and another soldier, Charles Veale, each grabbed a flag from him before the colors could touch the ground. Now carrying the American flag, Fleetwood continued forward under heavy fire until it became clear that the unit could not penetrate the enemy defenses. Retreating to the reserve line, he used the flag to rally a small group of men and continue the fight. For their actions during the battle, Fleetwood, Hilton, and Veale were each issued the Medal of Honor just over six months later, on April 6, 1865. Fleetwood's official Medal of Honor citation reads simply: "Seized the colors, after two color bearers had been shot down, and bore them nobly through the fight." The medal is now part of the collection of the Smithsonian's National Museum of American History. Sergeant Major Fleetwood's Medal of Honor was donated by his daughter Edith Fleetwood in 1948. Fleetwood also won a General B. F. Butler Medal, presumably for his action in the same engagement.

=== Discharge ===
Although every officer of the regiment sent a petition for him to be commissioned an officer, Secretary of War Edwin Stanton did not recommend an appointment. Fleetwood was honorably discharged from the Army on May 4, 1866. Fleetwood's 1864 service is in part detailed; in a diary, he wrote that year full of entries about his experiences during the war.

== Post-war life ==
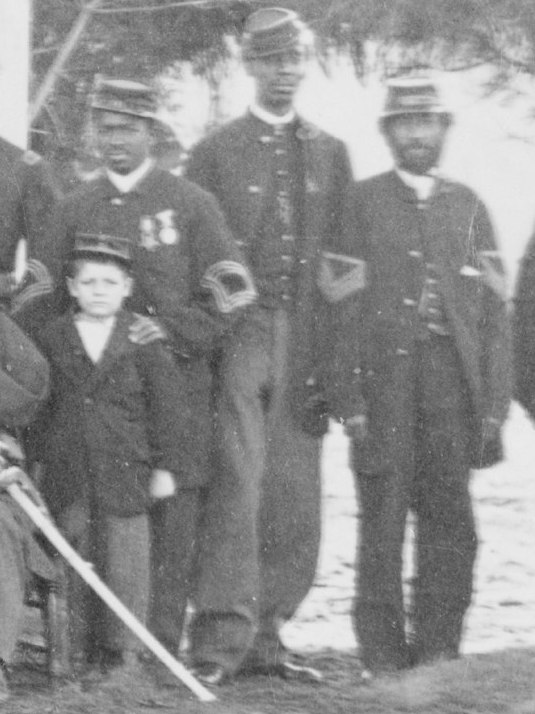
Standing At left Sgt Major Christian Fleetwood wearing both the Medal of Honor and the Butler Medal with Non-Commissioned Officers of the 4th U.S. Colored Infantry, Fort Slocum, April 1865

=== Jobs and life ===
After the war, Fleetwood worked as a bookkeeper in Columbus, Ohio, until 1867 and in several minor government positions in the Freedmen's Bank and War Department in Washington, D.C. With his wife Sara Iredell, whom he married on November 16, 1869, he led an active social life. Sara Iredell's grandmother, Louisa Burr, was the sister of Philadelphia abolitionist John (Jean) Pierre Burr and daughter of U.S. vice president, Aaron Burr. Sara's maternal uncle, novelist Frank J. Webb, lived with the couple in Washington in 1870 while writing for Frederick Douglass' New Era. The Fleetwoods had one daughter, Edith. They were well acquainted with most of the prominent African Americans of the period, many of who frequently visited their residence. Members of Washington's black elite society presented Fleetwood with a testimonial in 1889.

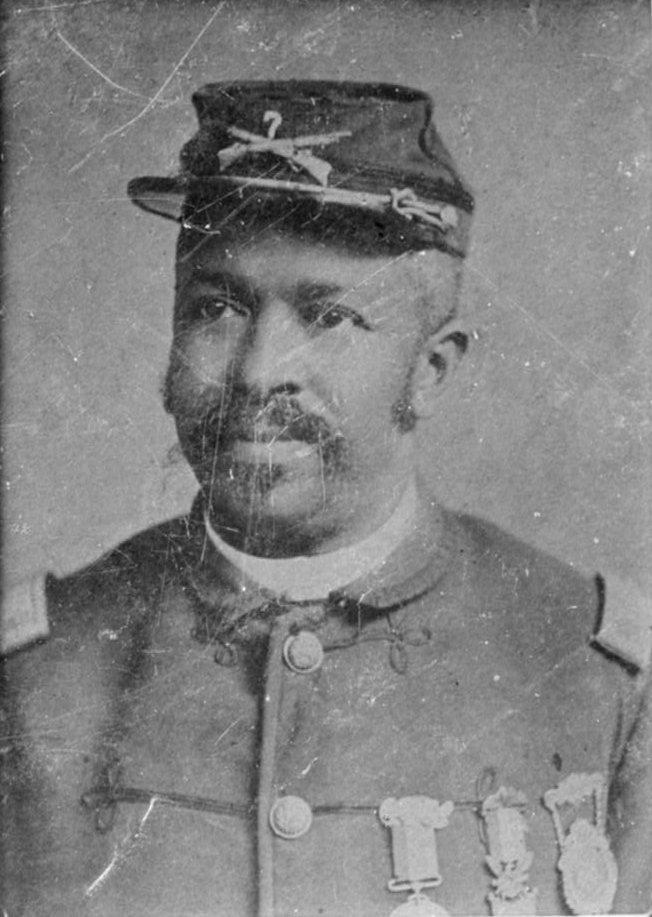
Christian A. Fleetwood, as major of the 7th bn DCNG, ca. 1889 (note the cap badge with crossed muskets and unit number "7")

=== National Guard ===
In January 1881, Fleetwood was elected Captain of the Washington Colored National Guard, better known as Washington Cadets or Washington Cadet Corps (WCC, not to be confused with the Washington High School Cadets, in which Fleetwood later became involved). At first, the WCC was organized as a single company and commanded by Captain George D. Graham on June 12, 1880, when Fleetwood joined the corps as a commissioned officer. The WCC expanded to a three-, then four-company-battalion and remained an all-black unit, including its commissioned officers.

On July 18, 1887, the WCC transformed into the 6th Battalion of the District of Columbia Army National Guard (DCNG). Fleetwood organized that battalion and became its commanding officer with the rank of major. The DCNG amalgamated seven battalions with four of them consisting of white members and three of them being "black" the Butler Zouaves (organized in 1863), the Washington Cadet Corps (1880), and the Capital City Guards (1882). While the Butler Zouaves, was disbanded in 1888, the two remaining black battalions were restricted to two companies each and merged into the newly created First Separate Battalion in 1891. The Butler Zouaves was disassembled by Albert Ordway, a leader of the National Guard, because of his displeasure towards the black regiments. Ordway was unsuccessful at disbanding the other two black units. When Frederick C. Revells from the Capital City Guards was made the new commander, Fleetwood felt passed over himself and resigned shortly afterward, in 1892.

Meanwhile, Fleetwood and Major Charles B. Fisher, who had commanded the Fifth Battalion (Butler Zouaves), were instrumental in organizing the Colored High School Cadet Corps of the District of Columbia in 1888. Also known as the Washington High School Cadets (see above), the corps' first company was recruited at M Street High (later to become Dunbar High School). Fleetwood, the first instructor of the corps, served until 1897 when he was succeeded by Major Arthur Brooks. These two officers developed a tradition of military service among young colored men in Washington which led some of them to enlist in World War I and others to be commissioned at the Colored Officers Training Camp in Fort Des Moines, Iowa.

=== After National Guard ===
Fleetwood never returned to active duty with any military organization. However, many residents of the District of Columbia recommended that he be appointed as the Commander of the 50th U.S. Colored Volunteer Infantry during the Spanish–American War. This request was not seriously considered by the War Department, and the participation of colored soldiers from the District of Columbia was similarly disregarded. It is not known whether Fleetwood's short stature and physical ailments reduced his chances for consideration. His army records state that he was five feet, four and one half inches tall. These records also state that he applied in 1891 for a pension, which he finally received because of "total" deafness in his left ear, the result of "gunshot concussion," and "severe" deafness in his right ear, the result of catarrh contracted while in the army. The last monthly pension payment was disbursed in September 1914, by then 24 U.S. Dollars. His application also stated that these ailments prevented him from speaking or singing in public.

Before being hampered by his progressing deafness, Fleetwood served for several years as a choirmaster of the 15th Street Presbyterian Church, St. Luke's and St. Mary's Protestant Episcopal Churches, as well as the Berean Baptist Church. Supported by the community, including the wives of former presidents (Lucy Webb Hayes and Frances Folsom Cleveland), his musical presentations were extremely successful.

== Death and legacy ==
He died suddenly of heart failure in Washington, D.C., on September 28, 1914, at age 74. Funeral services were held at St. Luke's Episcopal Church. The interment was in Columbian Harmony Cemetery, Washington, D.C. The First Separate Battalion of D.C. National Guards served as an escort at his funeral. Among the honorary pallbearers were Major Arthur Brooks and such prominent Washingtonians as Daniel Murray, Whitefield McKinlay, and Judge Robert H. Terrell. The participation by the National Guard, and by Arthur Brooks in particular, was an appropriate recognition of the most significant aspects of Fleetwood's career. His remains were moved to National Harmony Memorial Park when Columbia Harmony Cemetery closed in 1959.

== Medal of Honor citation ==
Rank and organization: Sergeant Major, 4th U.S. Colored Troops, Place and date: At Chapin's Farm, Va., September 29, 1864. Entered service at: unknown. Birth: Baltimore, Maryland. Date of issue: April 6, 1865.

His citations read:

The President presented Sergeant Major Fleetwood the Medal of Honor because of his fearlessness during the Chapin's Farm, Virginia battle among his men in the 4th U.S. Colored Infantry. Fleetwood had seized the two Color Bearer's colors after they were shot down. He wore them honorably throughout the rest of the fight.

== See also ==
- List of African American Medal of Honor recipients
- List of American Civil War Medal of Honor recipients: A–F
