= Alfred B. Hilton =

American Civil War Medal of Honor recipient

- Born: c. 1842; Hopewell Village, Maryland, U.S.
- Died: October 21, 1864 (aged 21–22)
- Burial place: Hampton National Cemetery; Hampton, Virginia, U.S.
- Military career
- Allegiance: United States; Union
- Branch: United States Army; Union Army
- Service years: 1863–1864
- Rank: Sergeant
- Units: Company H, 4th Regiment United States Colored Infantry
- Conflicts: American Civil War; *Battle of Chaffin's Farm
- Awards: Medal of Honor

Alfred B. Hilton (c. 1842 – October 21, 1864) was an African American Union Army soldier during the American Civil War and a recipient of America's highest military decoration—the Medal of Honor—for his actions at the Battle of Chaffin's Farm.

== Biography ==
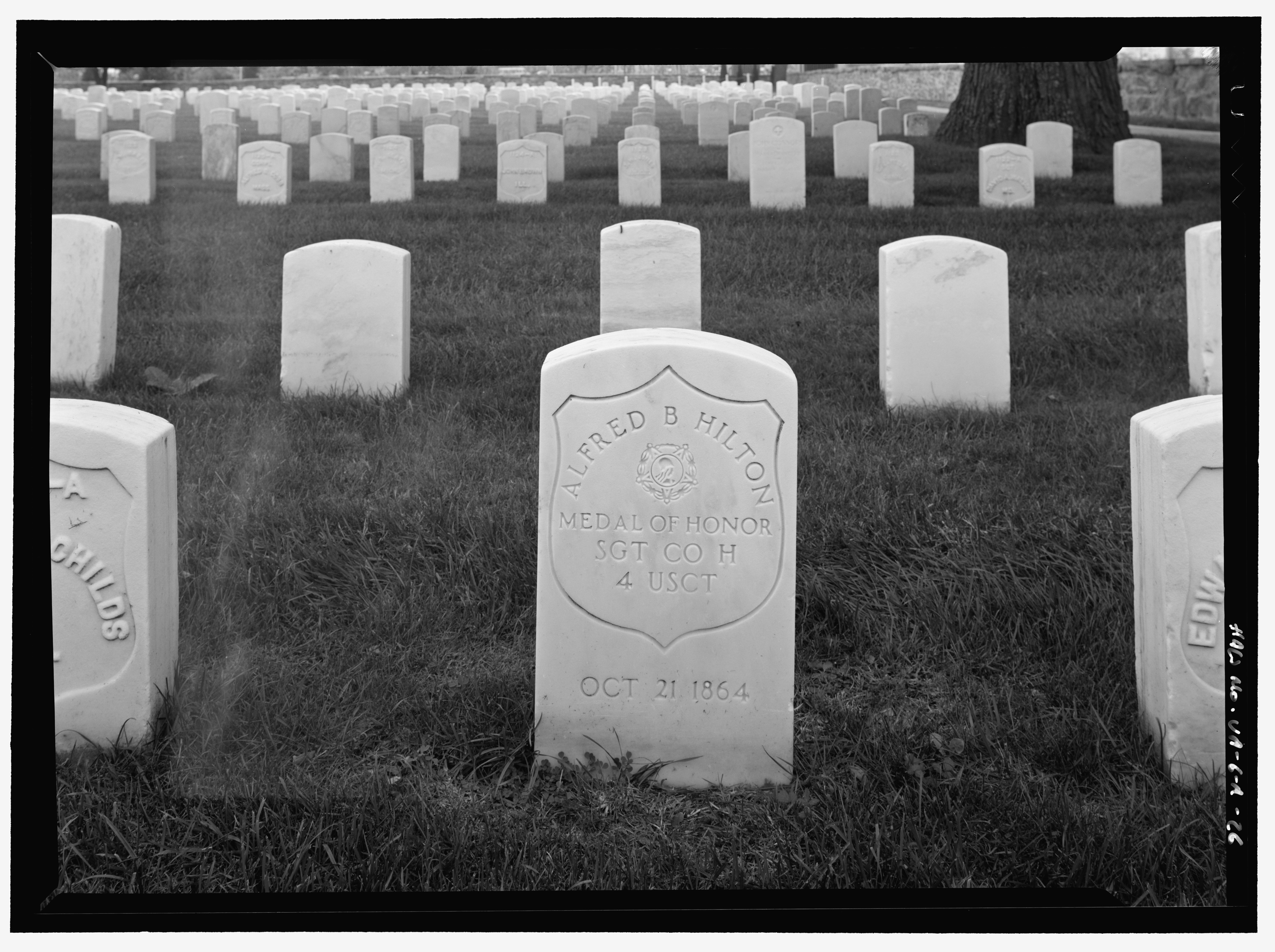
Hilton's grave at Hampton National Cemetery

Around 1842, Alfred B. Hilton was born near Hopewell Village, Maryland to Harriet and Isaac Hilton.

In 1863, Hilton enlisted with the 4th Regiment United States Colored Infantry. By September 29, 1864, Hilton was a Sergeant in Company H of the regiment. On that day, his unit participated in the Battle of Chaffin's Farm on the outskirts of the Confederate capital of Richmond, Virginia. During the battle, Hilton carried the American flag as part of the unit's color guard. As the 4th Regiment charged the enemy fortifications, Hilton grabbed a second flag, the regimental colors, from a wounded soldier. When he was himself seriously wounded by a shot through the leg, he called out "Boys, save the colors!" Two of his fellow soldiers stepped forward; Sergeant Major Christian Fleetwood took the American flag and Private Charles Veale grabbed the blue regimental flag, each before the colors could touch the ground.

Hilton died of his wounds nearly a month later, on October 21. Six months after the battle, on April 6, 1865, he was posthumously issued the Medal of Honor for his actions at Chaffin's Farm. The men who had taken the flags after he was wounded, Fleetwood and Veale, also received the medal.

Hilton is buried in Hampton National Cemetery, Hampton, Virginia.

== Medal of Honor citation ==
Rank and organization: Sergeant, Company H, 4th U.S. Colored Troops. Place and date. At Chapins Farm, Va., September 29, 1864. Entered service at:------. Birth: Harford County, Md. Date of issue: April 6, 1865.

Citation:

When the regimental color bearer fell, this soldier seized the color and carried it forward, together with the national standard, until disabled at the enemy's inner line.

== Legacy ==
In 2021, a monument to Hilton is planned at the David R. Craig Park in Havre de Grace, Maryland.

== See also ==
- List of American Civil War Medal of Honor recipients: G–L
- List of African American Medal of Honor recipients
- List of Medal of Honor recipients
