= Whitefield J. McKinlay =

American politician

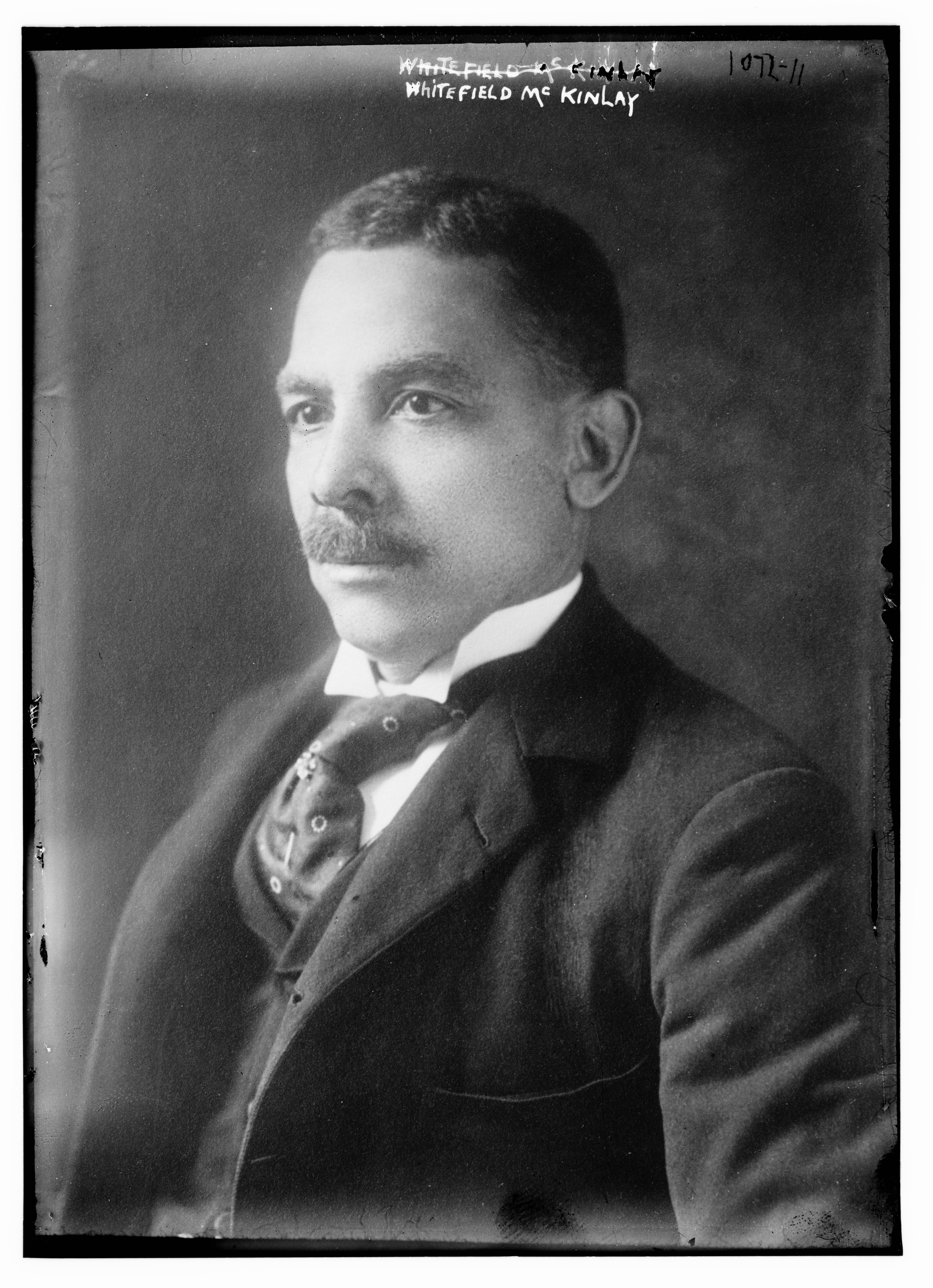

Whitefield J. McKinlay (September 15, 1852 – December 14, 1941) was a teacher, state legislator, and real estate businessman who lived in Charleston, South Carolina and then Washington D.C. The Library of Congress has a glass plate negative portrait of him. In other photographs he is among leaders of Charleston's African American community. He was a Republican. Many of his letters remain.

He was born in Charleston, South Carolina to George and Mary E. Weston McKinlay. He studied at Avery Institute, West Point, Iowa College and the University of South Carolina. His years at the University of South Carolina during the Reconstruction era when it was opened up to African Americans ended when Democrats regained control.

His uncle, William McKinlay (1808-1873) was elected to serve in South Carolina's 1868 legislature along with numerous other African Americans and Republicans.

He married Kate Wheeler and moved to Washington D.C. as conditions for African Americans deteriorated for African Americans in South Carolina. Washington D.C. became less inclusive in the years after their arrival as Democrats held power and Jim Crow era segregation took hold. McKinlay was invited to attend the dedication of the Lincoln Memorial in 1922. He and other African American guests learned they were to be segregated in a separate section upon arrival.
