= Butler Medal =

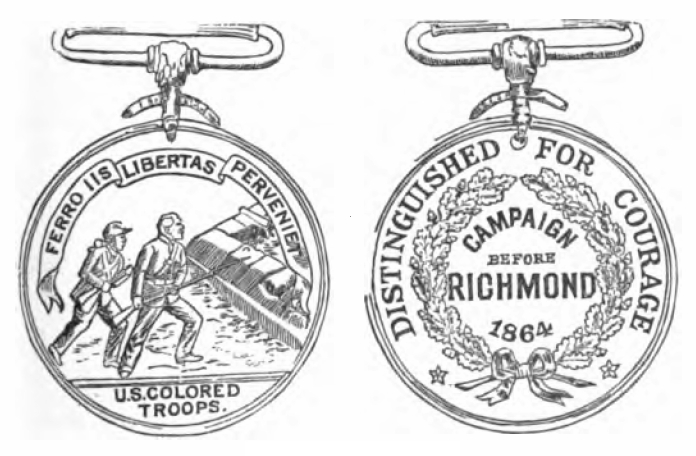
- Butler Medal, obverse and reverse
- Type: Medal
- Presented by: Department of War
- Status: No longer in use / Civil War only

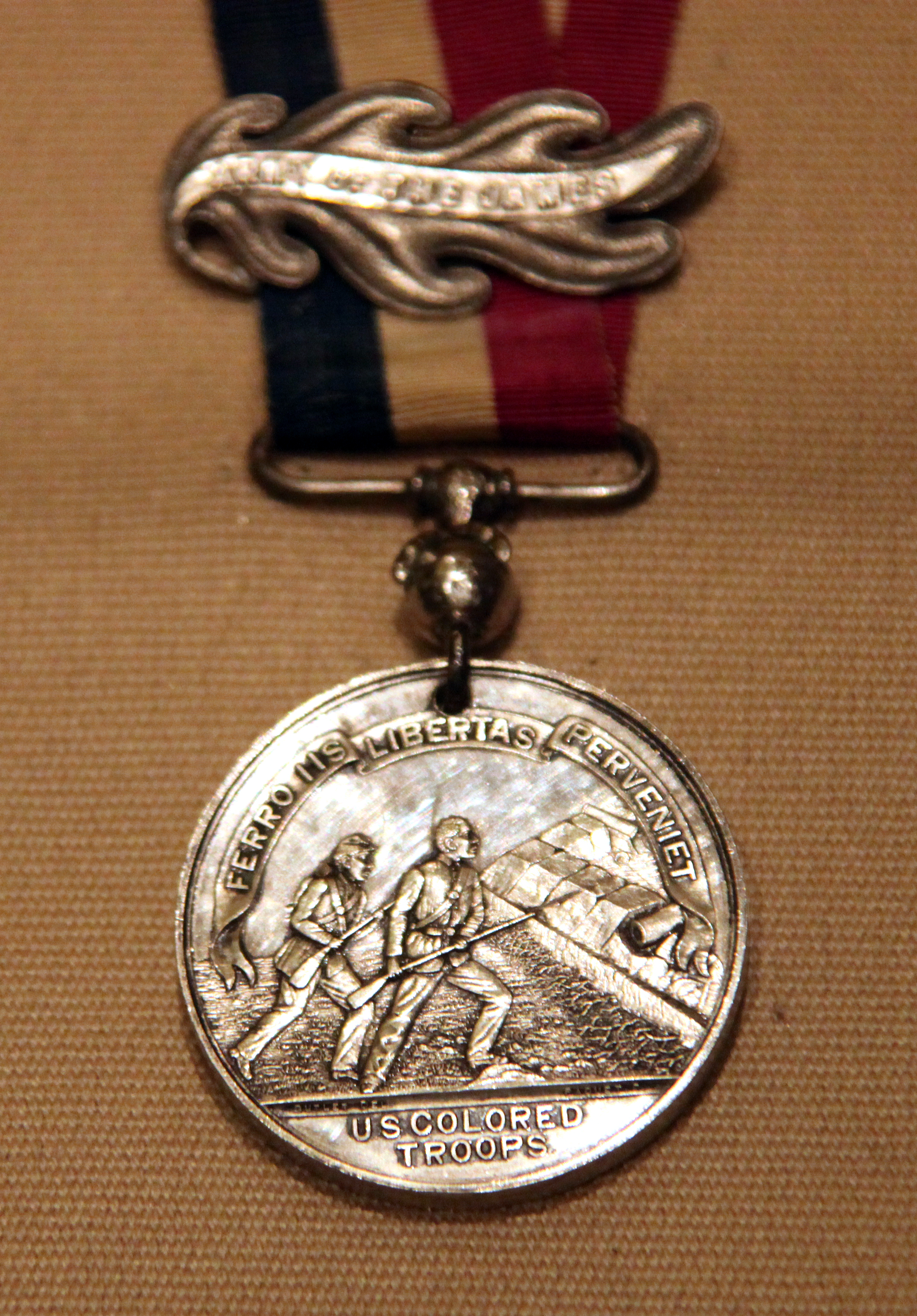
U.S. Colored Troops Medal issued by General Benjamin Butler.

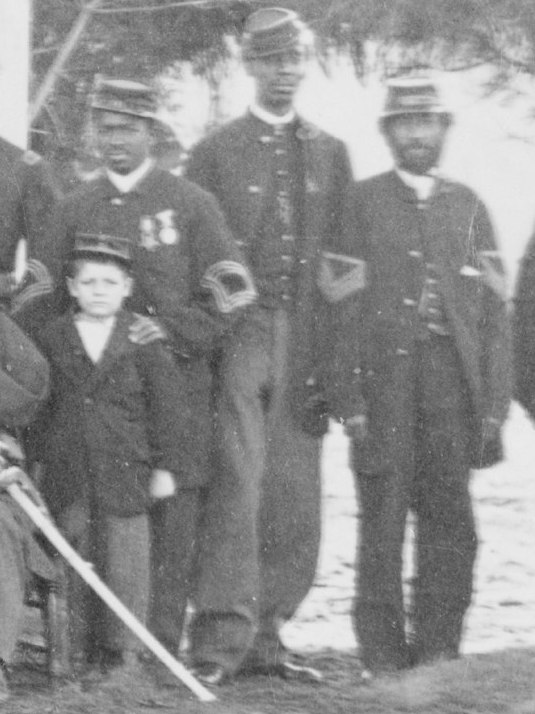
Standing At left Sgt Major Christian Fleetwood wearing both the Medal of Honor and the Butler Medal with Non Commissioned Officers of the 4th U.S. Colored Infantry, Fort Slocum, April, 1865

The Butler Medal, also known as the Colored Troops Medal, was a military decoration of a unit of the United States Army which was issued in 1865. The medal was commissioned by Major General Benjamin Butler and was intended to recognize meritorious or heroic acts of bravery performed by African American soldiers at the Battle of Chaffin's Farm and New Market Heights. Fourteen African Americans had earned the Medal of Honor in that engagement, but Butler wished to further recognize his African American troops involved in the battle, and he paid for the Butler Medals out of his personal funds.

In May 1865, and later that year, the Butler Medal was presented to nearly two hundred African American Union soldiers. The medal was originally known as the Colored Troops Medal, but the name was changed to Butler Medal after the close of the Civil War.

The Butler Medal was solid silver, suspended from a red, white, and blue ribbon meant to be worn around the neck. Attached to the ribbon was a wreath reading "Army of the James". The front of the medal depicts African American troops moving forward in battle, below an inscription in Latin which reads, Ferro iis libertas perveniet: "Freedom Will be Theirs by the Sword."

The obverse of the medal has a curved inscription that says, in capital letters:

DISTINGUISHED FOR COURAGE

After the war, Butler said the following about the medal:

I had the fullest reports made to me of the acts of individual bravery of colored men on that occasion, and I had done for the negro soldiers, by my own order, what the government has never done for its white soldiers – I had a medal struck of like size, weight, quality, fabrication, and intrinsic value with those which Queen Victoria gave with her own hand to her distinguished private soldiers of the Crimea... These I gave with my own hand, save where the recipient was in a distant hospital wounded, and by the commander of the colored corps after it was removed from my command, and I record with pride that in that single action there were so many deserving that it called for a presentation of nearly two hundred.

–Benjamin Franklin Butler
