= List of African-American Medal of Honor recipients =

The Medal of Honor was created during the American Civil War and is the highest military decoration presented by the United States government to a member of its armed forces. Recipients must have distinguished themselves at the risk of their own life above and beyond the call of duty in action against an enemy of the United States. Because of the nature of this medal, it is commonly presented posthumously.

Of the 3,525 Medals of Honor awarded as of January 2025, 97 have been awarded to 96 different African-American recipients. Robert Augustus Sweeney is one of 19 men, and the only African American, to have been awarded two Medals of Honor.

A 1993 study commissioned by the United States Army investigated racial discrimination in the awarding of medals. At the time, no Medals of Honor had been awarded to black soldiers who served in World War II. After an exhaustive review of files, the study recommended that several black Distinguished Service Cross recipients be upgraded to the Medal of Honor. On January 13, 1997, President Bill Clinton awarded the Medal to seven African-American World War II veterans; of these, only Vernon Baker was still alive. On March 18, 2014, Melvin Morris, an African American Vietnam War veteran, was awarded the Medal of Honor following a review which recommended upgrading the Distinguished Service Cross he had originally earned for action in 1969. On October 17, 2018 John Canley an African-American U.S. Marine who fought in the Tet Offensive of the Vietnam War received The Medal of Honor 50 years after the heroism he displayed that earned him the Navy Cross.

== 19th century ==
=== American Civil War ===
Twenty-six African Americans earned the Medal of Honor during the American Civil War, including eight sailors of the Union Navy, fifteen soldiers of the United States Colored Troops, and three soldiers of other Army units. Fourteen African-American men earned the Medal for actions in the Battle of Chaffin's Farm, where a division of U.S. Colored Troops saw heavy action. Another four men, all sailors, earned their Medals at the Battle of Mobile Bay. William Harvey Carney was the first African American to perform an action for which a Medal of Honor was awarded, but Robert Blake was the first to actually receive the Medal (Blake's was issued in 1864, Carney did not receive his until 1900). It was common for Civil War Medals of Honor to be awarded decades after the conflict ended; in one case, Andrew Jackson Smith's Medal was not awarded until 2001, 137 years after the action in which he earned it. Smith's wait, caused by a missing battle report, is the second longest delay of the award for any recipient and the longest delay for an African American. President Obama awarded the Medal of Honor to Union Army First Lieutenant Alonzo Cushing for his actions at the Battle of Gettysburg in November 2014, making the 151-year delay it the longest between the action and receipt of the award.

This along with * indicates that the Medal of Honor was awarded posthumously

Note: Notes in quotations are derived or are copied from the official Medal of Honor citation

| Image | Name | Service | Rank | Unit | Place of action | Date of action | Notes |
|---|---|---|---|---|---|---|---|
| | Aaron Anderson | Navy | Landsman | USS Wyandank (1847) | Mattox Creek, Virginia | March 17, 1865 | "Participating with a boat crew in the clearing of Mattox Creek, L/man Anderson carried out his duties courageously in the face of a devastating fire which cut away half the oars, pierced the launch in many places and cut the barrel off a musket being fired at the enemy." |
| — | Bruce Anderson | Army | Private | 142nd New York Volunteer Infantry | Second Battle of Fort Fisher, North Carolina | January 15, 1865 | "Voluntarily advanced with the head of the column and cut down the palisading." |
| — | William H. Barnes | Army | Private | 38th U.S. Colored Infantry | Battle of Chaffin's Farm, Virginia | September 29, 1864 | "Among the first to enter the enemy's works; although wounded." |
| | Powhatan Beaty | Army | First Sergeant | 5th U.S. Colored Infantry | Battle of Chaffin's Farm, Virginia | September 29, 1864 | "Took command of his company, all the officers having been killed or wounded, and gallantly led it." |
| | Robert Blake | Navy | Sailor | USS Marblehead (1861) | off Legareville in the Stono River, Johns Island, South Carolina | December 25, 1863 | "[I]n an engagement with the enemy on John's Island. Serving the rifle gun, Blake, an escaped slave, carried out his duties bravely throughout the engagement which resulted in the enemy's abandonment of positions, leaving a caisson and one gun behind." |
| — | James H. Bronson | Army | First Sergeant | 5th U.S. Colored Infantry | Battle of Chaffin's Farm, Virginia | September 29, 1864 | "Took command of his company, all the officers having been killed or wounded, and gallantly led it." |
| — | William H. Brown | Navy | Landsman | USS Brooklyn (1858) | Battle of Mobile Bay, Alabama | August 5, 1864 | "[R]emained steadfast at his post and performed his duties in the powder division throughout the furious action which resulted in the surrender of the prize rebel ram Tennessee and in the damaging and destruction of batteries at Fort Morgan." |
| — | Wilson Brown | Navy | Landsman | USS Hartford | Battle of Mobile Bay, Alabama | August 5, 1864 | "Knocked unconscious into the hold of the ship when an enemy shellburst fatally wounded a man on the ladder above him, Brown, upon regaining consciousness, promptly returned to the shell whip on the berth deck and zealously continued to perform his duties although 4 of the 6 men at this station had been either killed or wounded by the enemy's terrific fire." |
| | William Harvey Carney | Army | Sergeant | 54th Massachusetts Volunteer Infantry | Battle of Fort Wagner, Morris Island, South Carolina | July 18, 1863 | "[G]rasped the flag, led the way to the parapet, and planted the colors thereon. When the troops fell back he brought off the flag, under a fierce fire in which he was twice severely wounded." |
| — | Decatur Dorsey | Army | Corporal | 39th United States Colored Infantry Regiment | Battle of the Crater, Petersburg, Virginia | July 30, 1864 | "Planted his colors on the Confederate works in advance of his regiment, and when the regiment was driven back to the Union works he carried the colors there and bravely rallied the men." |
| — | Thomas English | Navy | Signal Quartermaster | (United States Navy) USS New Ironsides | Aboard USS New Ironsides, First and Second Battles of Fort Fisher | Dec 1864 – Jan 1865 | For extraordinary heroism in action while serving on board the U.S.S. New Iron sides during action in several attacks on Fort Fisher, North Carolina, 24 and 25 December 1864; and 13, 14, and 15 January 1865. The ship steamed in and took the lead in the ironclad division close inshore and immediately opened its starboard battery in a barrage of well-directed fire to cause several fires and explosions and dismount several guns during the first two days of fighting. Taken under fire as she steamed into position on 13 January, the New Ironsides fought all day and took on ammunition at night despite severe weather conditions. When the enemy came out of his bombproofs to defend the fort against the storming party, the ship's battery disabled nearly every gun on the fort facing the shore before the cease-fire orders were given by the flagship. |
| | Christian Fleetwood | Army | Sergeant Major | 4th U.S. Colored Infantry | Battle of Chaffin's Farm, Virginia | September 29, 1864 | "Seized the colors, after 2 color bearers had been shot down, and bore them nobly through the fight." |
| | James Daniel Gardner | Army | Private | 36th United States Colored Infantry Regiment | Battle of Chaffin's Farm, Virginia | September 29, 1864 | "Rushed in advance of his brigade, shot a rebel officer who was on the parapet rallying his men, and then ran him through with his bayonet." |
| | James H. Harris | Army | Sergeant | 38th U.S. Colored Infantry | Battle of Chaffin's Farm, Virginia | September 29, 1864 | "Gallantry in the assault" |
| | Thomas R. Hawkins | Army | Private | 6th U.S. Colored Infantry | Battle of Deep Bottom, Virginia | July 21, 1864 | "Rescue of regimental colors." |
| — | Alfred B. Hilton* | Army | Sergeant | 4th U.S. Colored Infantry | Battle of Chaffin's Farm, Virginia | September 29, 1864 | "When the regimental color bearer fell, this soldier seized the color and carried it forward, together with the national standard, until disabled at the enemy's inner line." |
| | Milton M. Holland | Army | Sergeant Major | 5th U.S. Colored Infantry | Battle of Chaffin's Farm, Virginia | September 29, 1864 | "Took command of Company C, after all the officers had been killed or wounded, and gallantly led it." |
| — | Miles James | Army | Corporal | 36th United States Colored Infantry Regiment | Battle of Chaffin's Farm, Virginia | September 29, 1864 | "Having had his arm mutilated, making immediate amputation necessary, he loaded and discharged his piece with one hand and urged his men forward; this within 30 yards of the enemy's works." |
| | Alexander Kelly | Army | First Sergeant | 6th U.S. Colored Infantry | Battle of Chaffin's Farm, Virginia | September 29, 1864 | "Gallantly seized the colors, which had fallen near the enemy's lines of abatis, raised them and rallied the men at a time of confusion and in a place of the greatest danger." |
| | John Henry Lawson | Navy | Landsman | USS Hartford | Battle of Mobile Bay, Alabama | August 5, 1864 | Although "Wounded in the leg and thrown violently against the side of the ship when an enemy shell killed or wounded the 6-man crew as the shell whipped on the berth deck, Lawson, upon regaining his composure, promptly returned to his station and, although urged to go below for treatment, steadfastly continued his duties..." |
| | James Mifflin | Navy | Engineer's Cook | USS Brooklyn (1858) | Battle of Mobile Bay, Alabama | August 5, 1864 | "[R]emained steadfast at his post and performed his duties in the powder division throughout the furious action which resulted in the surrender of the prize rebel ram Tennessee and in the damaging and destruction of batteries at Fort Morgan." |
| | Joachim Pease | Navy | Seaman | USS Kearsarge | off Cherbourg, France | June 19, 1864 | "Acting as loader on the No. 2 gun during this bitter engagement, Pease exhibited marked coolness and good conduct and was highly recommended by the divisional officer for gallantry under fire." |
| | Robert Pinn | Army | First Sergeant | 5th U.S. Colored Infantry | Battle of Chaffin's Farm, Virginia | September 29, 1864 | "Took command of his company after all the officers had been killed or wounded and gallantly led it in battle." |
| — | Edward Ratcliff | Army | First Sergeant | 38th U.S. Colored Infantry | Battle of Chaffin's Farm, Virginia | September 29, 1864 | "Commanded and gallantly led his company after the commanding officer had been killed; was the first enlisted man to enter the enemy's works." |
| | Andrew Jackson Smith | Army | Corporal | 55th Massachusetts Volunteer Infantry | Battle of Honey Hill, South Carolina | November 30, 1864 | "Saving his regimental colors, after the color bearer was killed during al bloody charge called the Battle of Honey Hill, South Carolina" |
| — | Charles Veale | Army | Private | 4th U.S. Colored Infantry | Battle of Chaffin's Farm, Virginia | September 29, 1864 | "Seized the national colors after 2 color bearers had been shot down close to the enemy's works, and bore them through the remainder of the battle." |

=== Indian Wars ===
Eighteen African Americans earned the Medal of Honor during the Indian Wars of the western United States. Fourteen were "Buffalo Soldiers", members of the Army's first peacetime black regiments. The four Buffalo Soldier regiments, the 9th Cavalry, 10th Cavalry, 24th Infantry, and 25th Infantry, fought in campaigns throughout the west. The remaining four Medal of Honor recipients were U.S. Army Indian Scouts recruited from among the Black Seminoles, a group of Seminole Indians of African descent.

Note: Notes in quotations are derived or are copied in their entirety from the actual Medal of Honor citation

| Image | Name | Service | Rank | Unit | Place of action | Date of action | Notes |
|---|---|---|---|---|---|---|---|
| — | Thomas Boyne | Army | Sergeant | 9th Cavalry Regiment | Mimbres Mountains and near Ojo Caliente, New Mexico | May 29, 1879 and September 27, 1879 | "Bravery in action" |
| | Benjamin Brown | Army | Sergeant | 24th Infantry Regiment | Arizona | May 11, 1889 | "Although shot in the abdomen, in a fight between a paymaster's escort and robbers, did not leave the field until again wounded through both arms." |
| | John Denny | Army | Sergeant | 9th Cavalry Regiment | Las Animas Canyon, New Mexico | September 18, 1879 | "Removed a wounded comrade, under a heavy fire, to a place of safety." |
| | Pompey Factor | Army | Private | Indian Scouts | Pecos River, Texas | April 25, 1875 | "With 3 other men, he participated in a charge against 25 hostiles while on a scouting patrol." |
| | Clinton Greaves | Army | Corporal | 9th Cavalry Regiment | Florida Mountains, Luna County, New Mexico | January 24, 1877 | "While part of a small detachment to persuade a band of renegade Apache Indians to surrender, his group was surrounded. Cpl. Greaves in the center of the savage hand-to-hand fighting, managed to shoot and bash a gap through the swarming Apaches, permitting his companions to break free." |
| | Henry Johnson | Army | Sergeant | 9th Cavalry Regiment | Milk River, Colorado | October 2, 1879– October 5, 1879 | "Voluntarily left fortified shelter and under heavy fire at close range made the rounds of the pits to instruct the guards, fought his way to the creek and back to bring water to the wounded." |
| | George Jordan | Army | Sergeant | 9th Cavalry Regiment | Fort Tularosa and Carrizo Canyon, New Mexico | May 14, 1880 and August 12, 1881 | For repulsing a larger force of Indians on two separate occasions |
| | Isaiah Mays | Army | Corporal | 24th Infantry Regiment | Cedar Springs, Arizona | May 11, 1889 | "Gallantry in the fight between Paymaster Wham's escort and robbers. Mays walked and crawled 2 miles to a ranch for help." |
| | William McBryar | Army | Sergeant | 10th Cavalry Regiment | Salt River, north of Globe, Arizona | March 7, 1890 | "Distinguished himself for coolness, bravery and marksmanship while his troop was in pursuit of hostile Apache Indians." |
| — | Adam Paine | Army | Private | Indian Scouts | Canyon Blanco, Staked Plains, Texas (Red River War) | September 26, 1874 – September 27, 1874 | "Rendered invaluable service to Col. R. S. Mackenzie, 4th U.S. Cavalry, during this engagement." |
| — | Isaac Payne | Army | Trumpeter | Indian Scouts | Pecos River, Texas | April 25, 1875 | "With 3 other men, he participated in a charge against 25 hostiles while on a scouting patrol." |
| | Thomas Shaw | Army | Sergeant | 9th Cavalry Regiment | Carrizo Canyon, Cuchillo Negra Mountains, New Mexico | August 12, 1881 | "Forced the enemy back after stubbornly holding his ground in an extremely exposed position and prevented the enemy's superior numbers from surrounding his command." |
| — | Emanuel Stance | Army | Sergeant | 9th Cavalry Regiment | Kickapoo Springs, Texas | May 20, 1870 | "Gallantry on scout after Indians" |
| — | Augustus Walley | Army | Private | 9th Cavalry Regiment | Cuchillo Negro Mountains, New Mexico | August 16, 1881 | "Bravery in action with hostile Apaches" |
| — | John Ward | Army | Sergeant | Indian Scouts, 24th Infantry Regiment | Pecos River, Texas | April 25, 1875 | "With 3 other men, he participated in a charge against 25 hostiles while on a scouting patrol" |
| | Moses Williams | Army | First Sergeant | 9th Cavalry Regiment | Cuchillo Negro Mountains, New Mexico | August 16, 1881 | "Rallied a detachment, skillfully conducted a running flight of 3 or 4 hours, and by his coolness, bravery, and unflinching devotion to duty in standing by his commanding officer in an exposed position under a heavy fire from a large party of Indians saved the lives of at least 3 of his comrades." |
| — | William Othello Wilson | Army | Corporal | 9th Cavalry Regiment | Sioux Campaign | December 30, 1890 | "Bravery" |
| | Brent Woods | Army | Sergeant | 9th Cavalry Regiment | Gavilan Canyon, New Mexico | August 19, 1881 | "Saved the lives of his comrades and citizens of the detachment" |

=== Spanish–American War ===
Six African Americans earned the Medal of Honor during the Spanish–American War: five Buffalo Soldiers of the 10th Cavalry Regiment and one United States Navy sailor. Four of the five Buffalo Soldiers received the Medal for rescuing a trapped landing party during the Battle of Tayacoba.

Note: Notes in quotations are derived or are copied in their entirety from the actual Medal of Honor citation

| Image | Name | Service | Rank | Unit | Place of action | Date of action | Notes |
|---|---|---|---|---|---|---|---|
| | Edward L. Baker, Jr. | Army | Sergeant Major | 10th Cavalry Regiment | Santiago, Cuba | July 1, 1898 | "Left cover and, under fire, rescued a wounded comrade from drowning." |
| | Dennis Bell | Army | Private | 10th Cavalry Regiment | Battle of Tayacoba, Cuba | June 30, 1898 | "Voluntarily went ashore in the face of the enemy and aided in the rescue of his wounded comrades; this after several previous attempts at rescue had been frustrated." |
| — | Fitz Lee | Army | Private | 10th Cavalry Regiment | Battle of Tayacoba, Cuba | June 30, 1898 | "Voluntarily went ashore in the face of the enemy and aided in the rescue of his wounded comrades; this after several previous attempts had been frustrated." |
| | Robert Penn | Navy | Fireman First Class | USS Iowa (BB-4) | On board the U.S.S. Iowa off Santiago de Cuba | July 20, 1898 | "Performing his duty at the risk of serious scalding at the time of the blowing out of the manhole gasket on board the vessel, Penn hauled the fire while standing on a board thrown across a coal bucket 1 foot above the boiling water which was still blowing from the boiler." |
| — | William H. Thompkins | Army | Private | 10th Cavalry Regiment | Battle of Tayacoba, Cuba | June 30, 1898 | "Voluntarily went ashore in the face of the enemy and aided in the rescue of his wounded comrades; this after several previous attempts at rescue had been frustrated." |
| — | George H. Wanton | Army | Private | 10th Cavalry Regiment | Battle of Tayacoba, Cuba | June 30, 1898 | "Voluntarily went ashore in the face of the enemy and aided in the rescue of his wounded comrades; this after several previous attempts at rescue had been frustrated." |

== 20th century ==
=== World War I ===
Freddie Stowers was the first of only two African Americans to receive the Medal of Honor for actions in World War I. Stowers had led an assault on German trenches, continuing to lead and encourage his men even after being twice wounded. Stowers died of his wounds, and was shortly afterwards recommended for the Medal of Honor; however, this recommendation was never processed. In 1990, the Department of the Army conducted a review and the Stowers recommendation was uncovered. An investigation was launched, and based on results of the investigation the award of the Medal of Honor was approved. Stowers' Medal of Honor was presented on April 24, 1991—seventy-three years after he was killed-in-action. Henry Johnson's Medal of Honor was presented on June 2, 2015-eighty five years after he died.

This along with * indicates that the Medal of Honor was awarded posthumously

| Image | Name | Service | Rank | Unit | Place of action | Date of action | Notes |
|---|---|---|---|---|---|---|---|
| — | Freddie Stowers* | Army | Corporal | 371st Infantry Regiment, 93d Division | Hill 188, Champagne Marne Sector, France | September 28, 1918 | Led his squad to destroy a group of enemy soldiers and was leading them to another trench when he was killed |
| | Henry Johnson* | Army | Sergeant | U.S. 369th Infantry Regiment (United States), 93d Division | Argonne Forrest, Champagne Marne Sector, France | May 14, 1918 | Fought against a 24-man German raiding party |

=== World War II ===
No African American was awarded a Medal of Honor either during World War II or immediately afterwards with respect to their actions during that conflict. This changed in 1992 when a study conducted by Shaw University and commissioned by the U.S. Dept. of Defense and the United States Army asserted that systematic racial discrimination had been present in the criteria for awarding medals during the war. After an exhaustive review of files the study recommended that several of the Distinguished Service Crosses awarded to African Americans be upgraded to the Medal of Honor. On January 13, 1997, more than fifty years after the end of the war, President Bill Clinton awarded the Medal to seven African-American World War II veterans. Vernon Baker was the only living recipient—the other six men had been killed in action or died in the intervening years.

This along with * indicates that the Medal of Honor was awarded posthumously

Note: Notes in quotations are derived or are copied in their entirety from the actual Medal of Honor citation

| Image | Name | Service | Rank | Unit | Place of action | Date of action | Notes |
|---|---|---|---|---|---|---|---|
| | Vernon Baker | Army | First lieutenant | 370th Infantry Regiment, 92d Infantry Division (Colored) | near Viareggio, Italy | April 5, 1945 and April 6, 1945 | For extraordinary heroism in action on 5 and 6 April 1945, near Viareggio, Italy. |
| | Edward A. Carter, Jr.* | Army | Staff sergeant | 56th Armored Infantry Battalion, 12th Armored Division | near Speyer, Germany | March 23, 1945 | "For extraordinary heroism on March 23, 1945, near Speyer, Germany. |
| | John R. Fox* | Army | First lieutenant | 598th Field Artillery Battalion, 366th Infantry Regiment, 92nd Infantry Division (Colored) | the vicinity of Sommocolonia, Italy | December 26, 1944 | For Conspicuous gallantry and Intrepidity above and beyond the call of duty on 26 December 1944 in vicinity of Sommocolonia, Italy. |
| — | Willy F. James, Jr.* | Army | Private first class | 413th Infantry Regiment, 104th Infantry Division | near Lippoldsberg, Germany | April 7, 1945 | For Conspicuous gallantry and Intrepidity above and beyond the call of duty on 7 April 1945 near Lippoldsberg, Germany. |
| | Ruben Rivers* | Army | Staff sergeant | 761st Tank Battalion (Colored), 26th Infantry Division (United States) | Guebling, France | November 15, 1944 – November 19, 1944 | For extraordinary heroism in action during the 15–19 November 1944, toward Guebling, France. |
| | Charles L. Thomas* | Army | First lieutenant | 614th Tank Destroyer Battalion, 411th Infantry Regiment, 103rd Infantry Division | near Climbach, France | December 14, 1944 | "For extraordinary heroism in action on December 14, 1944, near Climbach, France. |
| | George Watson* | Army | Private | 2nd Battalion, 29th Quartermaster Regiment, Quartermaster Corps | Porloch Harbor, New Guinea | March 8, 1943 | When his ship was hit by enemy bombers he sacrificed himself to save several other crewmembers who could not swim and drowned when the suction of the ship sinking pulled him under |

=== Korean War ===
Two African Americans received the Medal of Honor for action in the Korean War; both were soldiers of the 24th Infantry Regiment. Despite a 1948 Executive Order commanding the integration of the military, segregated units persisted until 1954; the 24th Infantry was one of the last remaining all-black regiments, and these two men were the last African Americans to receive the Medal of Honor for actions while serving in a segregated unit.

This along with * indicates that the Medal of Honor was awarded posthumously

| Image | Name | Service | Rank | Unit | Place of action | Date of action | Notes |
|---|---|---|---|---|---|---|---|
| | Cornelius H. Charlton* | Army | Sergeant | 24th Infantry Regiment, 25th Infantry Division | Near Chipo-ri, Korea | June 2, 1951 | Using grenades and machine-gun fire he led his men to fight back a group of enemy soldiers until he was killed |
| | William Henry Thompson* | Army | Private first class | 24th Infantry Regiment, 25th Infantry Division | Near Haman, Korea | August 6, 1950 | Sacrificed his life to allow the rest of his unit to escape a group of enemy soldiers |

=== Vietnam War ===
Twenty-three African Americans were awarded the Medal of Honor for actions in the Vietnam War, including James Anderson, Jr., the first African-American Marine to receive the Medal.

This along with * indicates that the Medal of Honor was awarded posthumously

Note: Notes in quotations are derived or are copied in their entirety from the actual Medal of Honor citation

| Image | Name | Service | Rank | Unit | Place of action | Date of action | Notes |
|---|---|---|---|---|---|---|---|
| | James Anderson, Jr.* | Marine Corps | Private first class | 3rd Marine Regiment, 3rd Marine Division | Cam Lo, Vietnam | February 28, 1967 | Sacrificed his life by smothering a grenade with his body |
| | Webster Anderson | Army | Staff sergeant | 320th Field Artillery Regiment, 101st Airborne Division (Airmobile) | Tam Kỳ, Vietnam | October 15, 1967 | Anderson directed the defense of the unit's position and continued to lead after twice being severely wounded. |
| | Eugene Ashley, Jr.* | Army | Sergeant first class | 5th Special Forces Group (Airborne), 1st Special Forces | Battle of Lang Vei, Vietnam | February 6, 1968 – February 7, 1968 | Led 5 assaults against the enemy |
| | Oscar P. Austin* | Marine Corps | Private first class | 7th Marine Regiment, 1st Marine Division (Reinforced) | Da Nang, Vietnam | February 23, 1969 | Sacrificed his life to save a wounded Marine |
| | William Maud Bryant* | Army | Sergeant first class | 5th Special Forces Group, 1st Special Forces | Long Khánh Province, Vietnam | March 24, 1969 | Killed by an enemy rocket after leading his men on repeated attacks upon enemy bunkers |
| | John Canley | Marine Corps | Gunnery sergeant | 1st Battalion, 1st Marines, Company A | Huế | January 31, 1968 – February 6, 1968 | Originally awarded the Navy Cross which was upgraded to the Medal of Honor on October 17, 2018. |
| | Paris Davis | Army | Colonel | 5th Special Forces Group, 1st Special Forces | Bồng Sơn, Vietnam | June 17, 1965 – June 18, 1965 | Commander of a successful counterattack, that resulted in the elimination of nearly 100 enemy hostiles |
| | Rodney M. Davis* | Marine Corps | Sergeant | 5th Marine Regiment, 1st Marine Division | Quảng Nam Province, Vietnam | September 6, 1967 | Sacrificed his life by smothering a grenade with his body |
| Jenkins in Vietnam with belts of ammo | Robert H. Jenkins, Jr.* | Marine Corps | Private first class | 3rd Marine Division (Reinforced) | Fire Support Base Argonne, DMZ, Vietnam | March 5, 1969 | Sacrificed his life to shield a wounded Marine from an exploding grenade |
| | Lawrence Joel | Army | Specialist six | 503d Infantry Regiment, 173d Airborne Brigade | Vietnam | November 8, 1965 | After a long battle with enemy soldiers and despite his own wounds he continued to treat wounded until he was ordered to evacuate |
| | Dwight H. Johnson | Army | Specialist five | 69th Armor Regiment, 4th Infantry Division | Dak To, Kon Tum Province, Vietnam | January 15, 1968 | Risked his life to repeatedly attack a group of enemy soldiers until all of the enemy had been repulsed or killed |
| | Ralph H. Johnson* | Marine Corps | Private first class | 1st Marine Division (Reinforced) | Hill 146, Quan Duc Valley, Vietnam | March 5, 1968 | Sacrificed his life by smothering a grenade with his body |
| — | Garfield M. Langhorn* | Army | Private first class | 17th Cavalry Regiment, 1st Aviation Brigade | Plei Djereng, Pleiku Province, Vietnam | January 15, 1969 | Sacrificed his life by smothering a grenade with his body |
| | Matthew Leonard* | Army | Sergeant first class | 16th Infantry Regiment, 1st Infantry Division | Suoi Da, Vietnam | February 28, 1967 | Although severely wounded he continued to fight the enemy until succumbing to his wounds |
| | Donald Russell Long* | Army | Sergeant | 4th Cavalry Regiment, 1st Infantry Division | Vietnam | June 30, 1966 | Sacrificed his life by smothering a grenade with his body |
| | Melvin Morris | Army | Staff sergeant | Third Company, Third Battalion of the IV Mobile Strike Force | Chi Lăng, Vietnam | September 17, 1969 | Shot three times while retrieving a wounded comrade |
| | Milton L. Olive, III* | Army | Private first class | 503rd Infantry Regiment, 173rd Airborne Brigade | Phu Cuong, Vietnam | October 22, 1965 | Sacrificed his life by smothering a grenade with his body |
| | Riley L. Pitts* | Army | Captain | 27th Infantry Regiment, 25th Infantry Division | Ap Dong, Vietnam | October 31, 1967 | Led his men against numerous attacks against the enemy until they had been defeated |
| | Charles Calvin Rogers | Army | Lieutenant colonel | 5th Field Artillery Regiment, 1st Infantry Division | Fishook region (near the Cambodian border), Vietnam | November 1, 1968 | Lt. Col. Rogers severely wounded fought and continued to give encouragement and direction while repelling an enemy attack" |
| — | Ruppert L. Sargent* | Army | First lieutenant | 9th Infantry Regiment, 25th Infantry Division | Hậu Nghĩa Province, Vietnam | March 15, 1967 | Sacrificed his life by smothering two enemy grenades with his body |
| | Clarence Sasser | Army | Private first class | 60th Infantry Regiment, 9th Infantry Division | Ding Tuong Province, Vietnam | January 10, 1968 | Although wounded himself he proceeded to administer first aid to the wounded for more than five hours until they were evacuated |
| — | Clifford Chester Sims* | Army | Staff sergeant | 501st Parachute Infantry Regiment, 101st Airborne Division | Huế, Vietnam | February 21, 1968 | Sacrificed his life by smothering a grenade with his body |
| | John E. Warren, Jr.* | Army | First lieutenant | 22d Infantry Regiment, 25th Infantry Division | Tây Ninh Province, Vietnam | January 14, 1969 | Treated the wounded and administered last rites to the dead and dying until he was killed by the enemy |

== 21st century ==
=== Iraq War ===
Alwyn Crendall Cashe (July 13, 1970 – November 8, 2005) was a United States Army non-commissioned officer who was posthumously awarded the Medal of Honor for heroism in Iraq. On November 10, 2020, the United States Congress voted to upgrade Cashe's initially awarded Silver Star to the Medal of Honor. On December 16, 2021, more than 16 years after his death at age 35, Cashe's widow, Tamara, accepted the Medal of Honor from President Joe Biden at a ceremony commemorating the actions of Cashe and two fellow soldiers for their acts in separate battles.

This along with * indicates that the Medal of Honor was awarded posthumously

Note: Notes in quotations are derived or are copied in their entirety from the actual Medal of Honor citation

| Image | Name | Service | Rank | Unit | Place of action | Date of action | Notes |
|---|---|---|---|---|---|---|---|
| | Alwyn Cashe* | Army | Sergeant First Class | Alpha Company, 1st Battalion, 15th Infantry Regiment, 3rd Infantry Division | near Samarra, Iraq | October 17, 2005 | Sergeant First Class Alwyn C. Cashe distinguished himself by acts of gallantry above and beyond the call of duty while serving in Salah Ad Din Province, Iraq, on October 17, 2005. |

== Non-combat ==
Before World War II, the Medal of Honor could be awarded for actions not involving direct combat with the enemy; eight African Americans earned the Medal in this way, all of them sailors. Robert Augustus Sweeney received two peacetime Medals of Honor, one of only 19 men, and the only African American, to be awarded the medal twice. Most of the non-combat medals, including both of Sweeney's, were awarded for rescuing or attempting to rescue someone from drowning.

This along with * indicates that the Medal of Honor was awarded posthumously

Note: Notes in quotations are derived or are copied in their entirety from the actual Medal of Honor citation

| Image | Name | Service | Rank | Unit | Place of action | Date of action | Notes |
|---|---|---|---|---|---|---|---|
| | Daniel Atkins | Navy | Ship's Cook First Class | USS Cushing | aboard ship at sea | February 11, 1898 | Attempted to save the life of an officer who fell overboard at sea |
| — | John Davis | Navy | Ordinary Seaman | USS Trenton | Toulon, France | February 1881 | "Jumping overboard, Davis rescued Augustus Ohlensen, coxswain, from drowning" |
| — | Alphonse Girandy | Navy | Seaman | USS Petrel | aboard ship at sea | March 31, 1901 | "[F]earlessly exposing his own life to danger for the saving of others" |
| — | John Johnson | Navy | Seaman | USS Kansas | near Greytown, Nicaragua | April 12, 1872 | "[D]isplayed great coolness and self-possession at the time Comdr. A. F. Crosman and others were drowned and, by extraordinary heroism and personal exertion, prevented greater loss of life." |
| — | William Johnson | Navy | Cooper | USS Adams | Navy Yard, Mare Island, California | November 14, 1879 | "[R]escued Daniel W. Kloppen, a workman, from drowning" |
| | Joseph B. Noil | Navy | Seaman | USS Powhatan | Norfolk, Virginia | December 26, 1872 | "[S]aved Boatswain J. C. Walton from drowning" |
| — | John Smith | Navy | Seaman | USS Shenandoah | Rio de Janeiro, Brazil | September 19, 1880 | "[R]escuing from drowning James Grady, first class fireman" |
| — | Robert Augustus Sweeney | Navy | Ordinary Seaman | First action: USS Kearsarge; Second action: USS Jamestown | First action: Hampton Roads, Virginia; Second action: Brooklyn Navy Yard | First action: October 26, 1881; Second action: December 20, 1883 | First action:"[J]umped overboard and assisted in saving from drowning a shipmate who had fallen overboard into a strongly running tide" Second action:"[R]escued from drowning A. A. George, who had fallen overboard from that vessel" |
