= Carter P. Johnson =

American major (1851–1916)

Carter Page Johnson
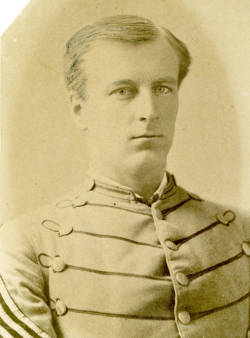
- Johnson in 1875
- Born: June 4, 1851; Staunton, Virginia, U.S.
- Died: December 12, 1916 (aged 65); Alliance, Nebraska, U.S.
- Education: Virginia Military Institute
- Military career
- Allegiance: United States
- Branch: United States Army
- Service years: 1871–1909; 1916
- Rank: Major
- Conflicts: Northern Cheyenne Exodus: Fort Robinson breakout; Spanish–American War: Santiago campaign; Battle of Tayacoba; Philippine–American War

Carter Page Johnson was an American major throughout the late 19th century and early 20th century. He was known for his career in the American Frontier and his leadership at the Battle of Tayacoba during the Santiago campaign of the Spanish–American War.

== Origin ==
Carter was born on June 4, 1851, at Staunton, Virginia as the son of William Bosewell Johnson and Margaret Breckinridge. His paternal grandparents were Chapman Johnson and Mary Nicholson and his maternal grandparents were John Breckinridge and Margaret Heiskell.

== Service in the Frontier ==
Johnson entered the Virginia Military Institute on August 10, 1871, as a cadet before graduating on July 2, 1875, ranking 28th out of 45 in his class. He proceeded to participate in the Northern Cheyenne Exodus at the Fort Robinson breakout. In 1882, he was promoted to Second Lieutenant and began serving at the 4th Infantry Regiment at Fort Robinson but was transferred to the 10th Cavalry Regiment and was transferred to Arizona. While there, he was part of the soldiers that pursued Geronimo and his disciples across the state. Despite the failure of attempting to find any of them, Johnson received commendation for his efforts in trying to find them.

== Spanish–American War ==
When the Spanish–American War broke out, 1st Lieutenant Johnson was assigned to Troop M of the 10th Cavalry Regiment and set out for Cuba. Departing from Lakeland, Florida on June 21 along with Lieutenant George P. Ahern and Captain Winthrop Astor Chanler, they would collaborate with General Emilio Núñez's forces at the mouth of the Tallabacoa River as they landed on the beachhead nearby to support the Cuban War of Independence. After a bombardment from the USS Peoria, the American and Cuban forces began making their way towards Trinidad, Cuba. At the Battle of Tayacoba, the Americans and Cubans came under heavy fire from the Spanish at the nearby jungles and were forced to retreat. During the battle, when Cuban forces managed to capture a fort and a block house, he took a barrel of rum and got drunk. He pulled down the Spanish flag, ran up his blouse as the American flag and drunkenly ordered his troops to fire on the Cubans but his men refused to follow the order.

== Later service ==
Johnson briefly served in the Philippine–American War but not desiring any further overseas service, Johnson was transferred to the 8th Cavalry Regiment. He retired in 1909 at Fort Robinson as a major and settled on a ranch west of the White River nearby the Fort. Johnson re-entered service on 1916, but suffered from heart problems while returning from a trip at Wheatland, Wyoming and died at Alliance, Nebraska.

== Legacy ==
Johnson was posthumously described as "an excellent soldier and efficient officer." Carter P. Johnson Lake near Scottsbluff, Nebraska is named after him.
