= George H. Wanton =

George Henry Wanton
- Born: May 15, 1868; Paterson, New Jersey, US
- Died: November 27, 1940 (aged 72)
- Burial place: Arlington National Cemetery
- Military career
- Allegiance: United States
- Branch: United States Navy; United States Army
- Service years: 1884–1888 (Navy); 1889–1925 (Army)
- Rank: Master Sergeant
- Units: Troop M, 10th Cavalry Regiment
- Conflicts: Spanish–American War; *Battle of Tayacoba
- Awards: Medal of Honor

George Henry Wanton (May 15, 1868 – November 27, 1940) was a Buffalo Soldier in the United States Army and a recipient of America's highest military decoration—the Medal of Honor—for his actions in the Spanish–American War. Wanton and three of his fellow Buffalo Soldiers were the last black servicemen to be presented the Medal of Honor for more than half a century.

== Biography ==
Wanton was born on May 15, 1868, in Paterson, New Jersey, the son of William H. and Margaret (Miller) Wanton. He served in the Navy from 1884 to 1888, and joined the Army in August 1889. By June 30, 1898, was serving as a private in Troop M of the 10th Cavalry Regiment. He and 49 other Buffalo Soldiers were selected to serve in a special operations role during Battle of Tayacoba. On that day, American forces aboard the Florida near Trinidad, Cuba, dispatched a landing party to provide reconnaissance on Spanish outposts in the area prior to a planned deployment of Cuban resistance fighters in the area. The party was discovered by Spanish scouts and came under heavy fire; their boats were sunk by enemy cannon fire, leaving them stranded on shore.

The men aboard the Florida launched several rescue attempts; the first four were forced to retreat under heavy fire. The fifth attempt, manned by Wanton and three other privates of the 10th Cavalry (Dennis Bell, Fitz Lee, and William H. Thompkins) under the command of Lieutenant Ahern, launched at night and successfully found and rescued the surviving members of the landing party. Upon return to the ship, Wanton volunteered to go back and retrieve the body of Captain Jose Manuel Núñez (brother of General Emilio Núñez) who had been killed on the beach, but this was deemed too risky.

One year later, on June 23, 1899, four of the rescuers were awarded the Medal of Honor for their actions in what had come to be known as the Battle of Tayacoba.

In November 1921, Wanton was selected as an honorary pallbearer at the burial of the Unknown Soldier.

George Wanton reached the rank of master sergeant and served in the Quartermaster Corps before leaving the Army.

He died at age 72 and was buried in Arlington National Cemetery, Arlington County, Virginia.

== Medal of Honor citation ==
Private Wanton's official Medal of Honor citation reads:

Voluntarily went ashore in the face of the enemy and aided in the rescue of his wounded comrades; this after several previous attempts at rescue had been frustrated.

== See also ==
- List of Medal of Honor recipients
- List of Medal of Honor recipients for the Spanish–American War
- List of African American Medal of Honor recipients
