= Battle of Tayacoba =

1898 battle of the Spanish-American War

- Part of the Spanish–American War
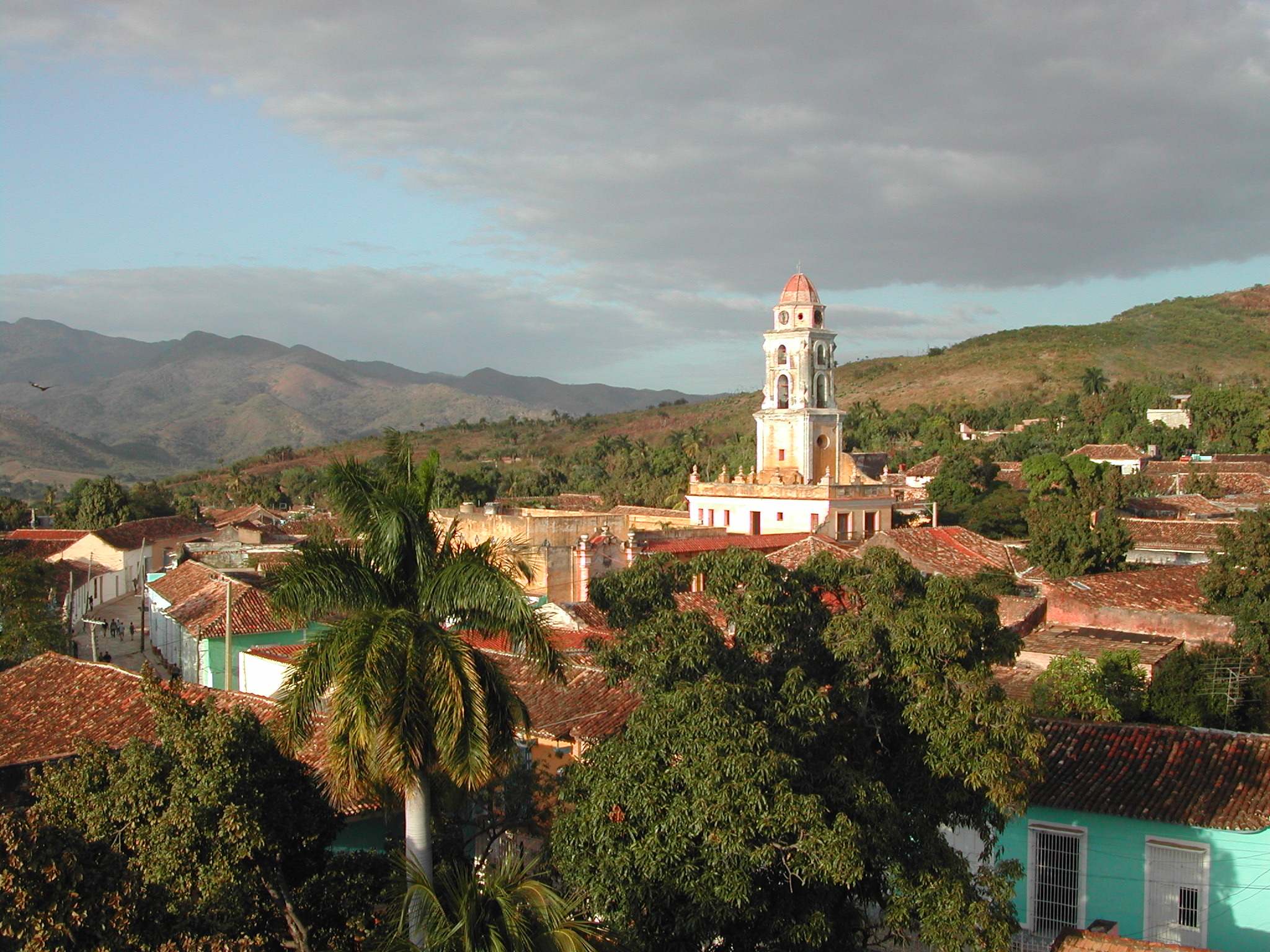
- Present-day view of Trinidad
Date	June 30, 1898
Location	Near Trinidad, Cuba
Result	Spanish victory

Belligerents
Spain	United States; Cuban rebels

Commanders and leaders
Unknown	Carter P. Johnson; Emilio Núñez

Strength
100	34; 1 gunboat

Casualties and losses
Unknown	8 killed and wounded

The Battle of Tayacoba, June 30, 1898, (also spelled Tayabacao) was an American special operations effort to land supplies and reinforcements to Cuban rebels fighting for their independence in the Spanish–American War.

== Background ==
On June 25 the American steamships Fanita and Florida accompanied by the gunboat USS Peoria left Key West carrying a cargo of troops, ammunition, supplies and arms (including two dynamite guns, 4,000 Springfield rifles and 200 Mauser rifles), to aid Cuban insurgents under the command of Máximo Gómez. On board were 650 Cubans under General Emilio Núñez, fifty troopers of the Tenth U.S. Cavalry under Carter P. Johnson and Second Lieutenant George P. Ahern, and twenty-five "Rough Riders" under Captain Winthrop Astor Chanler, brother of Captain William Astor Chanler.

The first attempt to land took place on June 29 near the port of Cienfuegos, at the mouth of the San Juan River, however as a result of a prior assault on May 11, the position was too heavily defended to effect a landing. On June 30 a landing party went ashore on a beachhead just west of Tunas de Zaza, near the mouth of the Tallabacoa River (mispronounced 'Tayacoba' by the Americans).

== Battle ==
Four miles west of the town, at the mouth of the river, stood a large fort built of railroad iron, surrounded by earthworks and defended by about 100 Spanish regulars. The Peoria fired several shots with her three-pounders into the fort but there was no response. Before dropping off mules, men, and materiel, a party of 30 Cubans and Americans led by Captain Jose Manuel Núñez (brother of General Núñez) and including Winthrop Chanler and Dr. William Louis Abbott, went ashore to ensure the safety of the landing site, about 500 yards east of the fort.

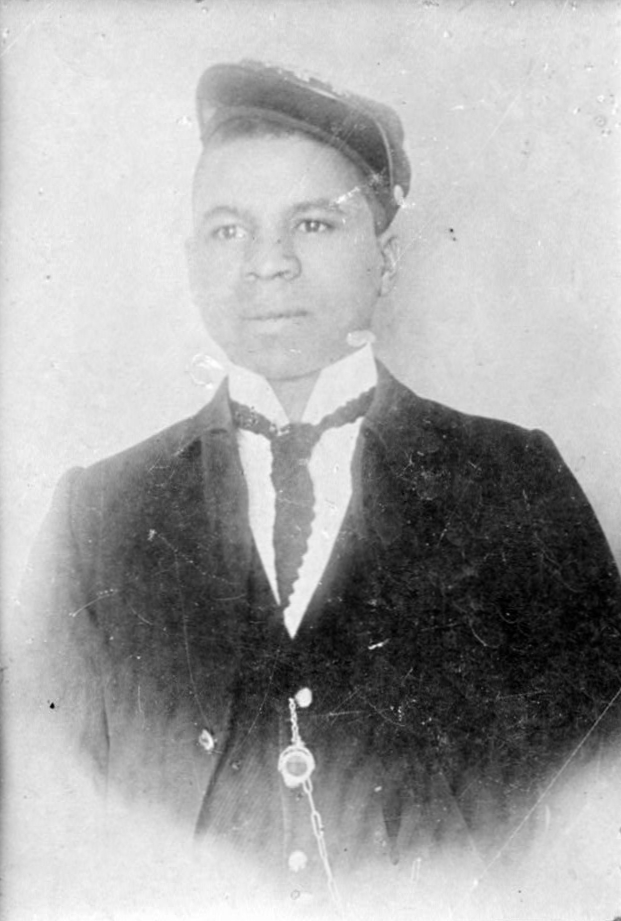
Private Dennis Bell was awarded the Medal of Honor after participating in the rescue of Cuban soldiers on the beach at Tayacoba.

Rowing onto the beach, the force crept into the jungle but was discovered by Spanish scouts and came under heavy fire. Unable to retaliate or even protect themselves, the Americans retreated onto the beach only to find that their boats had been sunk by Spanish cannon fire. Captain Núñez died of a gunshot wound to the head, Chanler was shot in the elbow, and Abbott was shot through the right shoulder. Five Cuban soldiers were also wounded. The party took cover in a mangrove swamp and one of them, a Danish surgeon named Dr. Maximilian Lund swam out to the Peoria (naked and armed only with a knife to fend off sharks) to report that survivors on the beach were in need of assistance.

== Rescue ==
The Peoria continued firing at the Spanish troops, who were hidden behind a grove of coconut palms. On the Florida Lieutenant Johnson began organizing rescue attempts. The first four were dispersed by heavy enemy fire and forced to retreat, but the fifth, operating under cover of darkness and crewed by four men of the U.S. 10th Cavalry under the command of Lieutenant Ahern, successfully located the Cuban survivors. The body of Captain Núñez was left on the beach.

Just before sunrise, a second boat manned by Lieutenant Ahern and war correspondent (later Lieutenant) Grover Flint located Chanler and Abbott. Once they were safely aboard, the Florida promptly left the bay.

== Aftermath ==
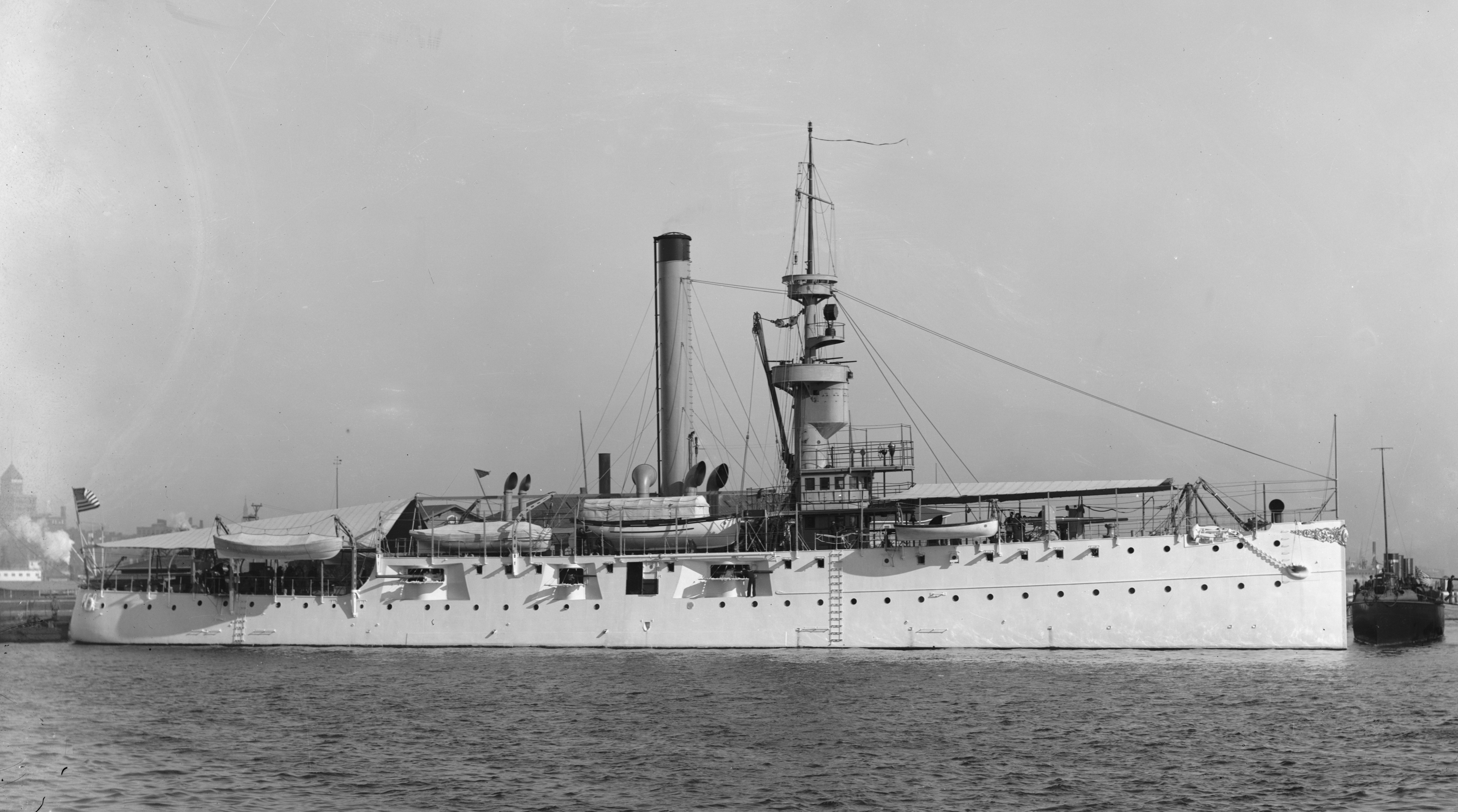
The USS Helena

On the afternoon of July 2 the Peoria returned to the mouth of the Tallacaboa River accompanied by the USS Helena and shelled the fort for 30 minutes, damaging it and the earthworks and setting fire to the Spanish quarter in the nearby town of Tunas de Zaza. The gunboats then proceeded 40 miles east to Palo Alto, near the town of Trinidad, where the Cuban troops and supplies disembarked on July 3.

On June 23, 1899, four of the five rescuers, Private William H. Thompkins, Private George H. Wanton, Trooper Dennis Bell, and Trooper Fitz Lee, all of the 10th US Cavalry, were awarded Medals of Honor for their heroism. Winthrop Chanler returned to his home in Barrytown, New York to recover from his injuries. He returned briefly to military service as a Captain in the American Expeditionary Forces during World War I. William Louis Abbott recovered from his wound and returned to his previous occupation as an ornithologist.
