= Dennis Bell (Medal of Honor) =

US Army soldier and Medal of Honor recipient (1866–1953)

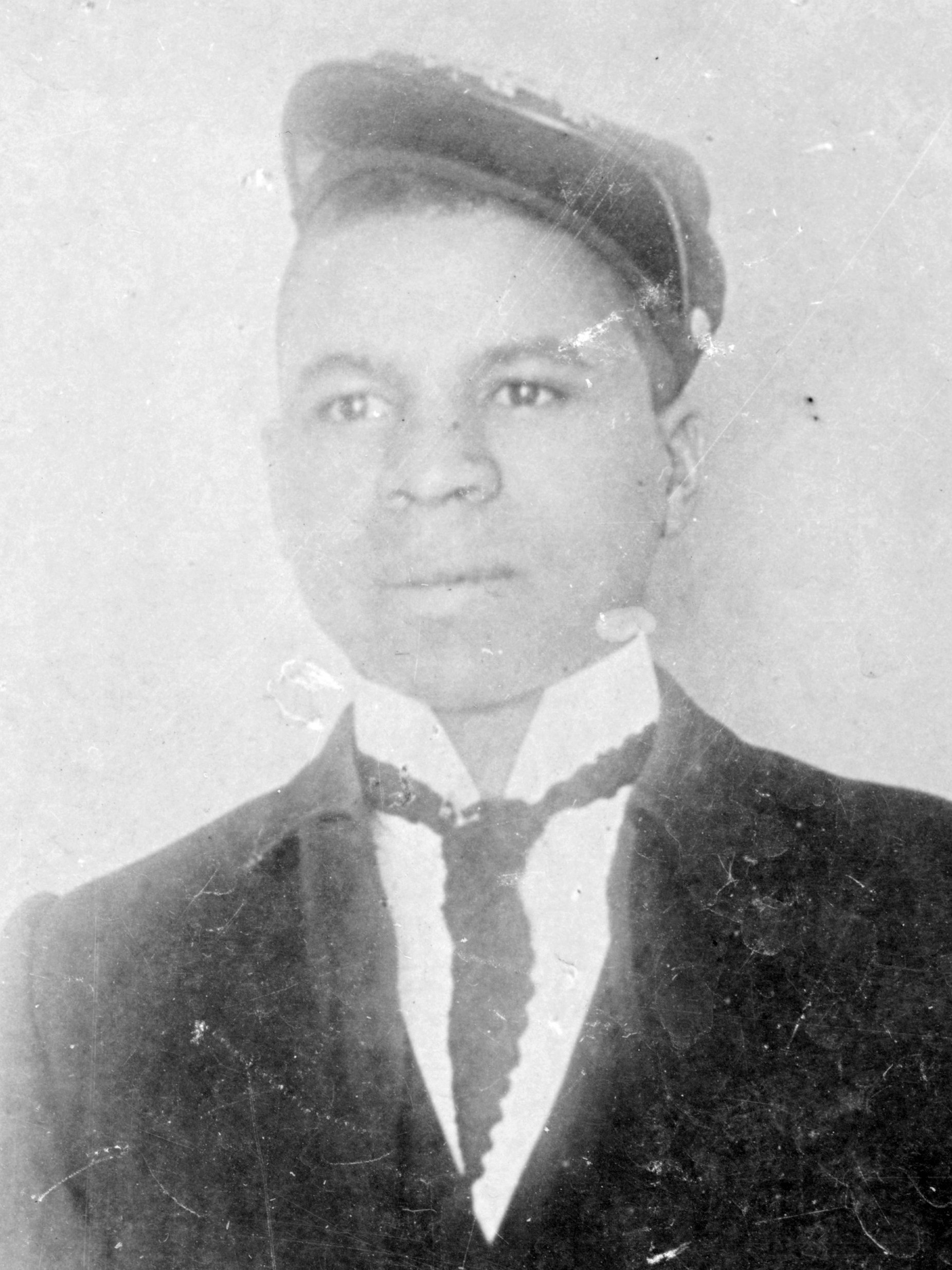
- Private Dennis Bell
- Born: December 28, 1866; Washington, D.C., US
- Died: September 25, 1953 (aged 86); Washington, D.C., US
- Burial place: Arlington National Cemetery
- Military career
- Allegiance: United States
- Branch: United States Army
- Service years: 1892–1903
- Rank: Corporal
- Units: Troop H, 10th Cavalry Regiment
- Conflicts: Spanish–American War; *Battle of Tayacoba
- Awards: Medal of Honor

Dennis Bell (December 28, 1866 – September 25, 1953) was a Buffalo Soldier in the United States Army and a recipient of America's highest military decoration—the Medal of Honor—for his actions in the Spanish–American War. Bell and three of his fellow Buffalo Soldiers were the last black servicemen to be presented the Medal of Honor for more than half a century.

== Military service ==
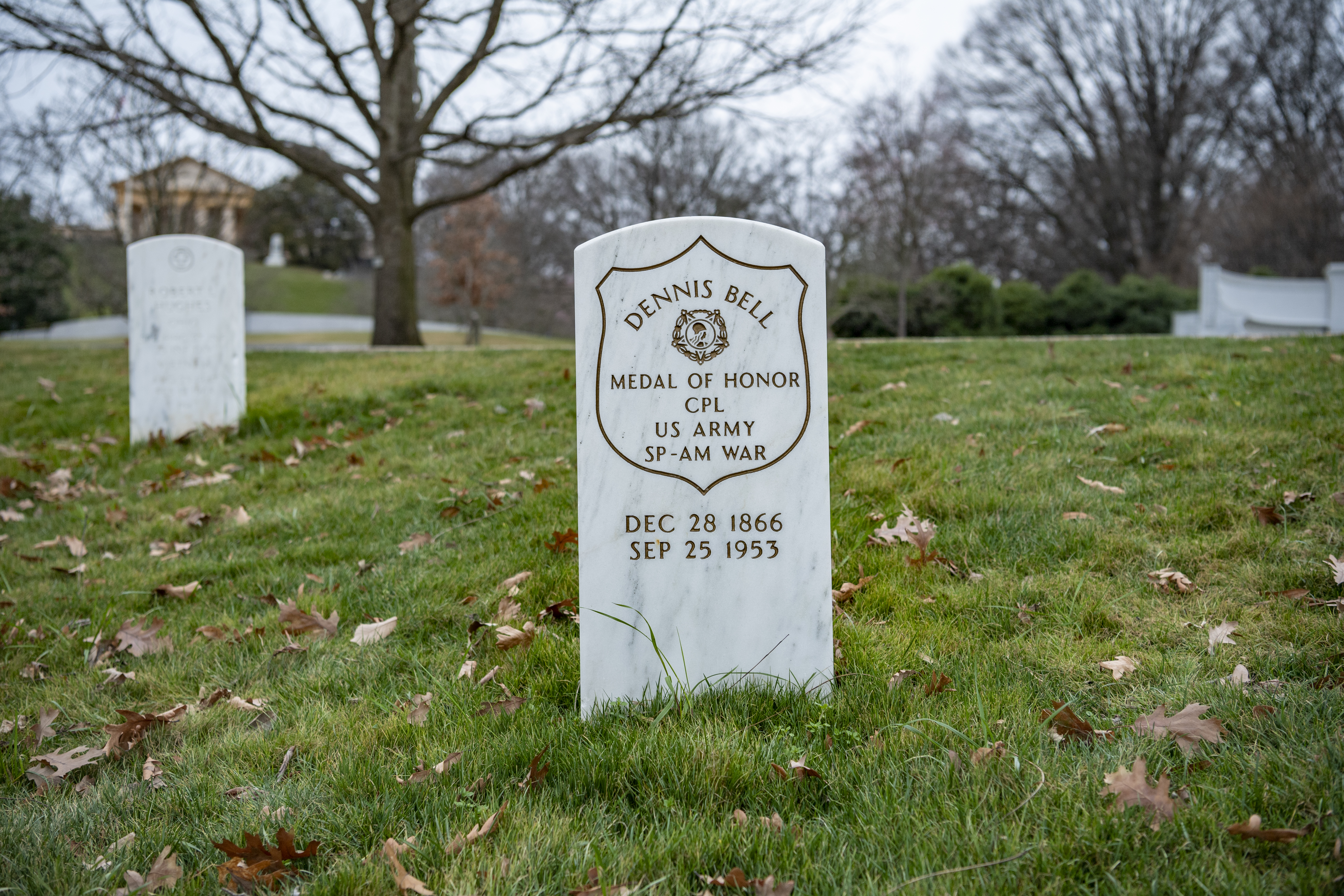
Grave at Arlington National Cemetery

Bell was born December 28, 1866, and joined the Army from Pittsburgh, Pennsylvania in December 1892. By June 30, 1898, he was serving as a private in Troop H of the 10th Cavalry Regiment. On that day, American forces aboard the Florida near Trinidad, Cuba, dispatched a landing party to provide reconnaissance on Spanish outposts in the area. The party was discovered by Spanish scouts and came under heavy fire; their boats were sunk by enemy cannon fire, leaving them stranded on shore.

The men aboard the Florida launched several rescue attempts; the first four were forced to retreat under heavy fire. The fifth attempt, manned by Bell and three other privates of the 10th Cavalry (Fitz Lee, William H. Thompkins, and George H. Wanton) under the command of Lieutenant Ahern, launched at night and successfully found and rescued the surviving members of the landing party. One year later, on June 23, 1899, four of the rescuers were awarded the Medal of Honor for their actions in what had come to be known as the Battle of Tayacoba.

Bell was promoted to the rank of corporal before his discharge in December 1903.

== Medal of Honor citation ==
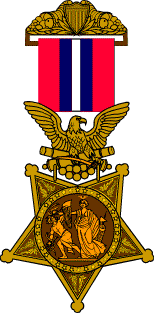

Rank and organization: Private, Troop H, 10th U.S. Cavalry. Place and date: At Tayacoba, Cuba, June 30, 1898. Entered service at: Washington, D.C. Date of issue: June 23, 1899.

Private Bell's official Medal of Honor citation reads:

Voluntarily went ashore in the face of the enemy and aided in the rescue of his wounded comrades; this after several previous attempts at rescue had been frustrated.

== Death and burial ==
Bell died at the Mount Alto Veterans Hospital in Washington, D.C., on September 25, 1953, and was buried at Arlington National Cemetery, in Arlington, Virginia.

His obituary in the September 28, 1953 Washington, D.C., Evening Star newspaper read:

Dennis Bell, Medal Of Honor Holder, 87 – Dennis Bell, 87, who won the Congressional Medal of Honor during the Spanish–American War, died Friday at Mount Alto Hospital. A retired Government employee, Mr. Bell was born here. He was a trooper in the 10th Cavalry during the Spanish–American War. He was awarded the country's highest military award for voluntarily going ashore under heavy fire to help rescue 14 wounded comrades in Cuba in 1898. He was a Mason.....Funeral services will be held at 11 a.m. Wednesday at Fort Meyer Chapel with burial in Arlington Cemetery. His body is at the Jarvis Funeral Home, 1432 U Street N.W.

== See also ==
- List of Medal of Honor recipients
- List of Medal of Honor recipients for the Spanish–American War
- List of African American Medal of Honor recipients
