= Fitz Lee (Medal of Honor) =

United States Army Medal of Honor recipient

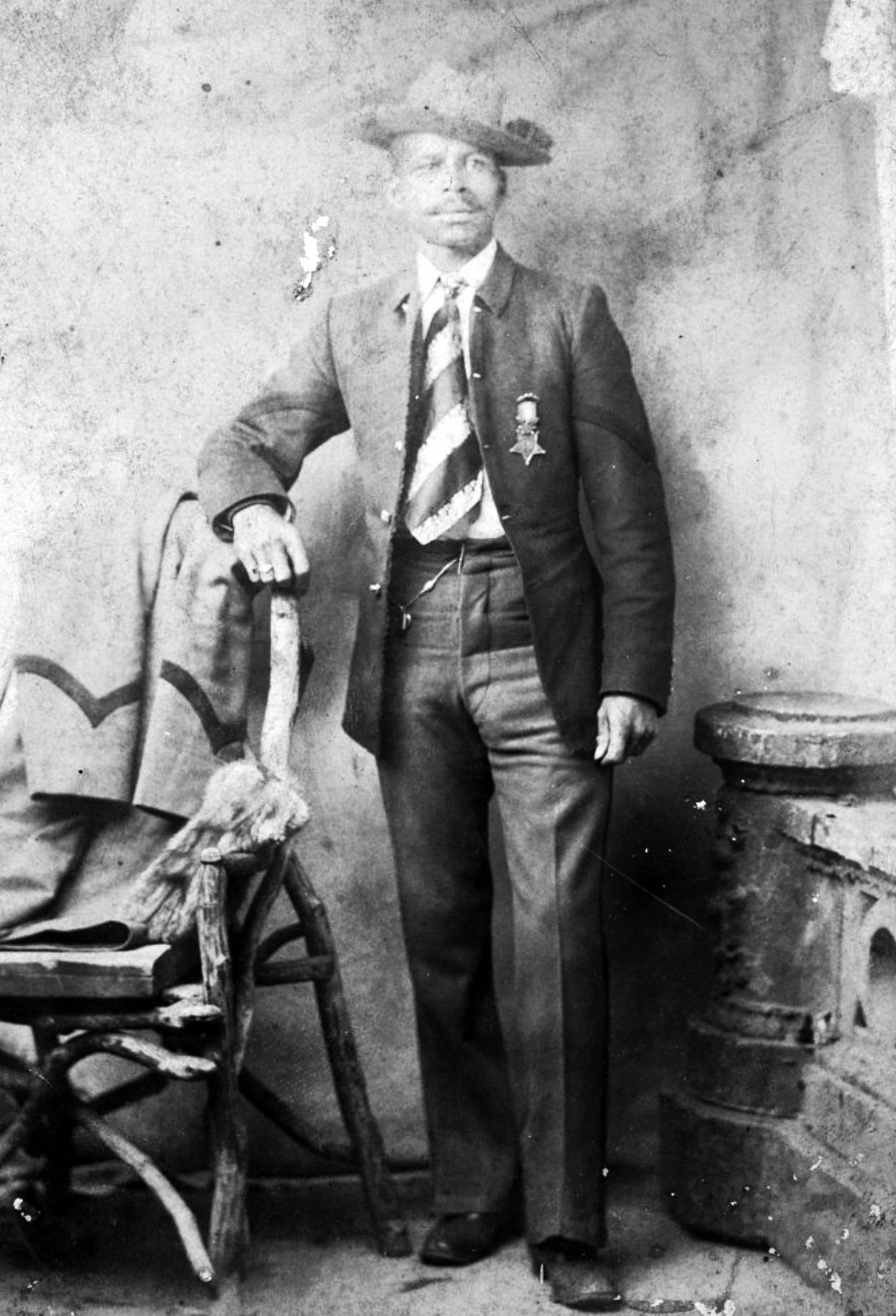
- Lee wearing his Medal of Honor in 1899
- Born: June 1866; Dinwiddie County, Virginia, U.S.
- Died: September 14, 1899 (aged 33); Leavenworth, Kansas, U.S.
- Burial place: Fort Leavenworth National Cemetery; Leavenworth County, Kansas, U.S.
- Military career
- Allegiance: United States
- Branch: United States Army
- Service years: 1889–1899
- Rank: Private
- Units: Troop M, 10th Cavalry Regiment
- Conflicts: Spanish–American War; Battle of Tayacoba
- Awards: Medal of Honor

Fitz Lee (June 1866 – September 14, 1899) was an American soldier who served as a cavalryman in the United States Army from 1889 to 1899. An African-American Buffalo Soldier, Lee is a recipient of the United States' highest military decoration—the Medal of Honor—due to his actions at the Battle of Tayacoba during the Spanish–American War. Since 2025, Lee has been the namesake of the Fort Lee army base in Virginia.

== Biography ==
Lee was born in Dinwiddie County, Virginia, and enlisted in the Army in Philadelphia, Pennsylvania, on December 26, 1889. He spent his entire career with the 10th Cavalry Regiment, stationed primarily in the Western United States. He re-enlisted in 1894 and 1897, both times at Fort Assinniboine, Montana.

On June 30, 1898, at the Battle of Tayacoba during Spanish–American War, Private Lee was with Troop M of the 10th Cavalry Regiment aboard the Florida, an Army Transport Service ship, off the Cuban coast. Some 300 Cuban freedom fighters, accompanied by 28 Americans, went ashore at Trinidad, Cuba, to link up with pro-American rebel Cubans under the command of General Máximo Gómez. The landing party was ambushed by the Spanish, forcing it to withdraw and leave 16 wounded men behind, who risked capture and execution as they were not uniformed regulars protected by the rules of war. After several unsuccessful rescue attempts, Lee and three other privates of the 10th Cavalry—Dennis Bell, William H. Thompkins and George H. Wanton—went ashore under the command of Lieutenant George P. Ahern and rescued the surviving members of the landing party. For their heroism, Lee and the three other privates were awarded the Medal of Honor.

Lee was diagnosed with malaria in September 1898. Complications from the disease led to kidney failure and a loss of eyesight and forced Lee's hospitalization at Fort Bliss, Texas, from March to July 1899. Lee was formally awarded the Medal of Honor on June 23, 1898, while at Fort Bliss. After being discharged, the penniless Lee arrived at Fort Leavenworth, Kansas, where he was cared for by old army comrades. Lee died at a friend's home on September 14, 1899, at the age of 33. He was buried with military honors at Fort Leavenworth National Cemetery.

== Fort Lee ==
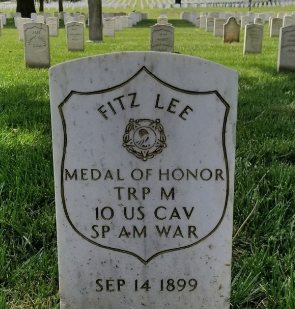
Lee's headstone at Fort Leavenworth National Cemetery

In June 2025, at the direction of President Donald Trump, the U.S. Army announced that Fort Gregg-Adams would return to its original name, Fort Lee, previously named for Confederate general Robert E. Lee, with Fitz Lee as its new namesake. At the renaming ceremony, the fort's commander, Major General Michelle Donahue, noted that Lee's birthplace of Dinwiddie County was only a few miles from the fort: "By bearing his name, this installation deepens its connection to our local heritage and our Army's enduring values. Fitz Lee's legacy is one of bravery, humility and unwavering commitment—qualities we must all strive to embody."

== Medal of Honor citation ==
Private, Troop M, 10th U.S. Cavalry
Tayacoba, Cuba, June 30, 1898

After a force had succeeded in landing and had been compelled to withdraw to the boats, leaving a number of killed and wounded ashore, he voluntarily went ashore in the face of the enemy and aided in the rescue of his wounded comrades who would otherwise have fallen into the hands of the enemy, this after several previous attempts had been frustrated.

== See also ==
- List of Medal of Honor recipients for the Spanish–American War
- List of African American Medal of Honor recipients
