= Robert Augustus Sweeney =

United States Navy Medal of Honor recipient (1853–1890)

- Grave at Calvary Cemetery
- Born: February 20, 1853; Montserrat
- Died: December 19, 1890 (aged 37)
- Burial place: Calvary Cemetery, New York City
- Military career
- Allegiance: United States of America
- Branch: United States Navy
- Service years: 1881 - 1884
- Rank: Ordinary Seaman
- Units: USS Kearsarge, USS Yantic
- Awards: Medal of Honor (2)

Robert Augustus Sweeney (February 20, 1853 – December 19, 1890) was a sailor in the United States Navy and is one of only nineteen servicemen, and the only African American, to receive the Medal of Honor twice, both for peace-time actions.

== Biography ==
Sweeney was born on February 20, 1853, on the Caribbean island of Montserrat. In 1950, the Bureau of Naval Personnel, published the leather bound Medal of Honor: the Navy, 1861-1949, stating Sweeney had been born in Montreal, Canada but this was corrected by the 1995 Facts on File two volume work, Medal of Honor Recipients 1863-1994.

== US Navy service ==
Sweeney joined the Navy in New Jersey. By October 26, 1881, he was serving as an ordinary seaman on the USS Kearsarge. While Kearsarge was anchored in Hampton Roads on that day, Seaman Edward Martin Christoverson fell from a Jacob's ladder attached to the ship's lower boom and landed in the water. Christoverson's inability to swim, combined with a strong tidal current and rough seas, led to him quickly beginning to sink. Seeing this, Sweeney jumped overboard without hesitation and went to his aid. In his panic, Christoverson latched onto Sweeney and dragged him under the water. Sweeney was able to break free, but was grabbed and dragged under a second time. One of Kearsarge's officers, Cadet Midshipman John B. Bernadon, then dived into the water and swam to help the men. Together, Sweeney and Bernadon were able to keep Christoverson afloat and, once their shipmates had thrown them a rope, pulled him back aboard ship. For this action, Sweeney was awarded his first Medal of Honor six days later, on November 1.

On the morning of December 20, 1883, the training ship USS Jamestown was at dock at the Brooklyn Navy Yard when it shifted berth and made fast alongside the USS Yantic. In the afternoon, at about 4:15, a 3rd Class Boy named Adam Alphonse George belonging to the Jamestown fell overboard from a plank between the Jamestown and the Yantic. The ship's log of the Yantic stated that he 'would have probably drown, if it had not been for the prompt action on the part of R. A. Sweeney (O. Sea) of this vessel, and one of the Jamestown's crew (J. W. Norris), who jumped overboard to his assistance'. The letter recommending Sweeney and Norris for Medals of Honor was written by the Commanding Officer of the Jamestown, Commander Allen D. Brown. Probably because Commander Brown recommended both men, the official citation incorrectly stated Sweeney was a member of the crew of Jamestown.

Sweeney died on December 19, 1890, at age 37 and is buried at Calvary Cemetery in Queens, New York in an unknown grave.

== Medal of Honor citation ==
Sweeney's first citation reads:

Serving on board the U.S.S. Kearsarge, at Hampton Roads, Va., 26 October 1881, Sweeney jumped overboard and assisted in saving from drowning a shipmate who had fallen overboard into a strongly running tide.

His second citation:

Serving on board the U.S.S. Jamestown, at the Navy Yard New York, 20 December 1883, Sweeney rescued from drowning A. A. George, who had fallen overboard from that vessel.

== See also ==
- List of Medal of Honor recipients during Peacetime
- List of African American Medal of Honor recipients
