= Alexander Haure Turvelin =

American Medal of Honor recipient

- Born: 1847; Russian Empire
- Died: Unknown
- Military career
- Allegiance: United States of America
- Branch: United States Navy
- Rank: Seaman
- Unit: USS Trenton
- Awards: Medal of Honor

Alexander Haure Turvelin (born 1847, date of death unknown) was a United States Navy sailor and a recipient of the United States military's highest decoration, the Medal of Honor.

Born in 1847 in the Russian Empire, Turvelin immigrated to the United States and by February 1881 was serving as a seaman on the USS Trenton. Sometime during that month, while Trenton was at Toulon, France, Coxswain Augustus Ohlensen fell overboard and, because he could not swim, began to sink. Turvelin and another sailor, Ordinary Seaman John Davis, jumped into the water and rescued Ohlensen from drowning. For this action, both he and Davis were awarded the Medal of Honor three and a half years later, on October 18, 1884.

Turvelin's official Medal of Honor citation reads:

For jumping overboard from the U.S.S. Trenton, at Toulon, France, February 1881, and rescuing from drowning Augustus Ohlensen, coxswain.

Details of his later life and burial are unknown.

== See also ==
- List of Medal of Honor recipients during peacetime
