= J. W. Norris =

- Born: 1862; Lancashire, England
- Died: Unknown
- Military career
- Allegiance: United States Navy
- Branch: United States Navy
- Rank: Landsman
- Unit: USS Jamestown
- Awards: Medal of Honor

John W. Norris (born 1862, date of death unknown) was a United States Navy sailor and a recipient of the United States military's highest decoration, the Medal of Honor.

== Biography ==
Born in 1862 in England, Norris immigrated to the United States and joined the Navy from New York. By December 20, 1883, he was serving as a landsman on the USS Jamestown. On that day, while Jamestown was at the Brooklyn Navy Yard, 3rd Class Boy Adam Alphonse George fell overboard. Norris and another sailor, Ordinary Seaman Robert Augustus Sweeney, jumped into the water and rescued him. For this action, both Norris and Sweeney were awarded the Medal of Honor the next year, on October 18, 1884.

Norris's official Medal of Honor citation reads:

Serving on board the U.S.S. Jamestown, New York Navy Yard, 20 December 1883, Norris rescued from drowning A. A. George, who had fallen overboard.

Norris is one of the hundreds of Medal of Honor recipients who are considered "lost to history", as his place of burial and other biographical details are unknown. There are records of a sailor named John W. Norris who was born in March 1862, lived in Fall River, Massachusetts, and worked as a nurse before joining the U.S. Navy. This Norris enlisted at New York City on June 18, 1883, and was discharged in June 1886. It is uncertain if this John W. Norris is the same man as J. W. Norris the Medal of Honor recipient.

== See also ==
- List of Medal of Honor recipients during peacetime
