= John Davis (Medal of Honor, 1881) =

- Born: 1854; Kingston, Jamaica
- Died: August 19, 1903 (aged 48–49)
- Military career
- Allegiance: United States
- Branch: Navy
- Rank: Ordinary Seaman
- Unit: USS Trenton
- Awards: Medal of Honor

John Davis (1854 – August 19, 1903) was a United States Navy sailor and a recipient of the United States military's highest decoration, the Medal of Honor.

== Biography ==
Born in 1854 in Kingston, Jamaica, Davis immigrated to the United States and by February 1881 was serving as an ordinary seaman on the USS Trenton. Sometime during that month, while Trenton was at Toulon, France, Coxswain Augustus Ohlensen fell overboard and, because he could not swim, began to sink. Davis and another sailor, Seaman Alexander Haure Turvelin, jumped into the water and rescued Ohlensen from drowning. For this action, both he and Turvelin were awarded the Medal of Honor three and a half years later, on October 18, 1884.

Davis' official Medal of Honor citation reads:

On board the U.S.S. Trenton, Toulon, France, February 1881. Jumping overboard, Davis rescued Augustus Ohlensen, coxswain, from drowning.

Davis left the Navy while still an ordinary seaman. He died at age 48 or 49.

== See also ==
- List of African-American Medal of Honor recipients
- List of Medal of Honor recipients during peacetime
