= William H. Thompkins =

Buffalo Soldier in the United States Army

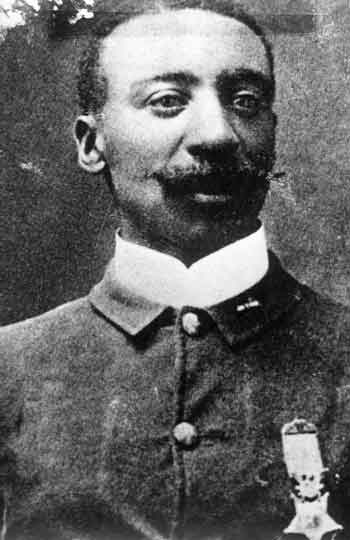
- Thompkins wearing his Medal of Honor
- Born: October 3, 1872; Paterson, New Jersey
- Died: September 24, 1916 (aged 43); San Francisco, California
- Burial place: San Francisco National Cemetery, San Francisco, California
- Military career
- Allegiance: United States of America
- Branch: United States Army
- Rank: Sergeant
- Units: Troop G, 10th Cavalry Regiment
- Conflicts: Spanish–American War • Battle of Tayacoba
- Awards: Medal of Honor

William H. Thompkins (October 3, 1872 – September 24, 1916) was a Buffalo Soldier in the United States Army and a recipient of America's highest military decoration—the Medal of Honor—for his actions in the Spanish–American War. Thompkins and three of his fellow Buffalo Soldiers were the last black servicemen to be presented the Medal of Honor for more than half a century.

== Biography ==
Thompkins joined the army from Cleveland, Ohio, in August 1889, claiming to be 21 years old. By June 30, 1898, was serving as a private in Troop G of the 10th Cavalry Regiment. On that day, American forces aboard the USS Florida near Trinidad, Cuba dispatched a landing party to provide reconnaissance on Spanish outposts in the area. The party was discovered by Spanish scouts and came under heavy fire; their boats were sunk by enemy cannon fire, leaving them stranded on shore.

The men aboard the Florida launched several rescue attempts; the first four were forced to retreat under heavy fire. The fifth attempt, manned by Thompkins and three other privates of the 10th Cavalry (Dennis Bell, Fitz Lee, and George H. Wanton) under the command of Lieutenant Ahern, launched at night and successfully found and rescued the surviving members of the landing party. One year later, on June 23, 1899, four of the rescuers were awarded the Medal of Honor for their actions in what had come to be known as the Battle of Tayacoba.

William Thompkins died in 1916 and was buried in San Francisco National Cemetery, San Francisco, California.

== Medal of Honor citation ==
Private Thompkins's official Medal of Honor citation reads:

After a force had succeeded in landing and had been compelled to withdraw to the boats, leaving a number of killed and wounded ashore, he voluntarily went ashore in the face of the enemy and aided in the rescue of his wounded comrades who would otherwise have fallen into the hands of the enemy, this after several previous attempts had been frustrated.

== See also ==
- List of Medal of Honor recipients
- List of Medal of Honor recipients for the Spanish–American War
- List of African American Medal of Honor recipients
