= John Russell (Medal of Honor) =

- Born: c. 1852; New York City
- Military career
- Allegiance: United States of America
- Branch: United States Navy
- Rank: Seaman
- Unit: USS Trenton
- Awards: Medal of Honor

John Russell (born c. 1852, date of death unknown) was a United States Navy sailor and a recipient of the United States military's highest decoration, the Medal of Honor.

== Biography ==
Born in about 1852 in New York, New York, Russell joined the Navy from that state. By September 21, 1880, he was serving as a seaman on the USS Trenton. On that day, while Trenton was at Genoa, Italy, he and Seaman Philip Moore jumped overboard and rescued Ordinary Seaman Hans Paulsen from drowning. For this action, both Russell and Moore were awarded the Medal of Honor four years later, on October 18, 1884.

Russell's official Medal of Honor citation reads:

For jumping overboard from the U.S.S. Trenton, at Genoa, Italy, 21 September 1880, and rescuing from drowning Hans Paulsen, ordinary seaman.

== See also ==
- List of Medal of Honor recipients during peacetime
