= William Johnson (Medal of Honor) =

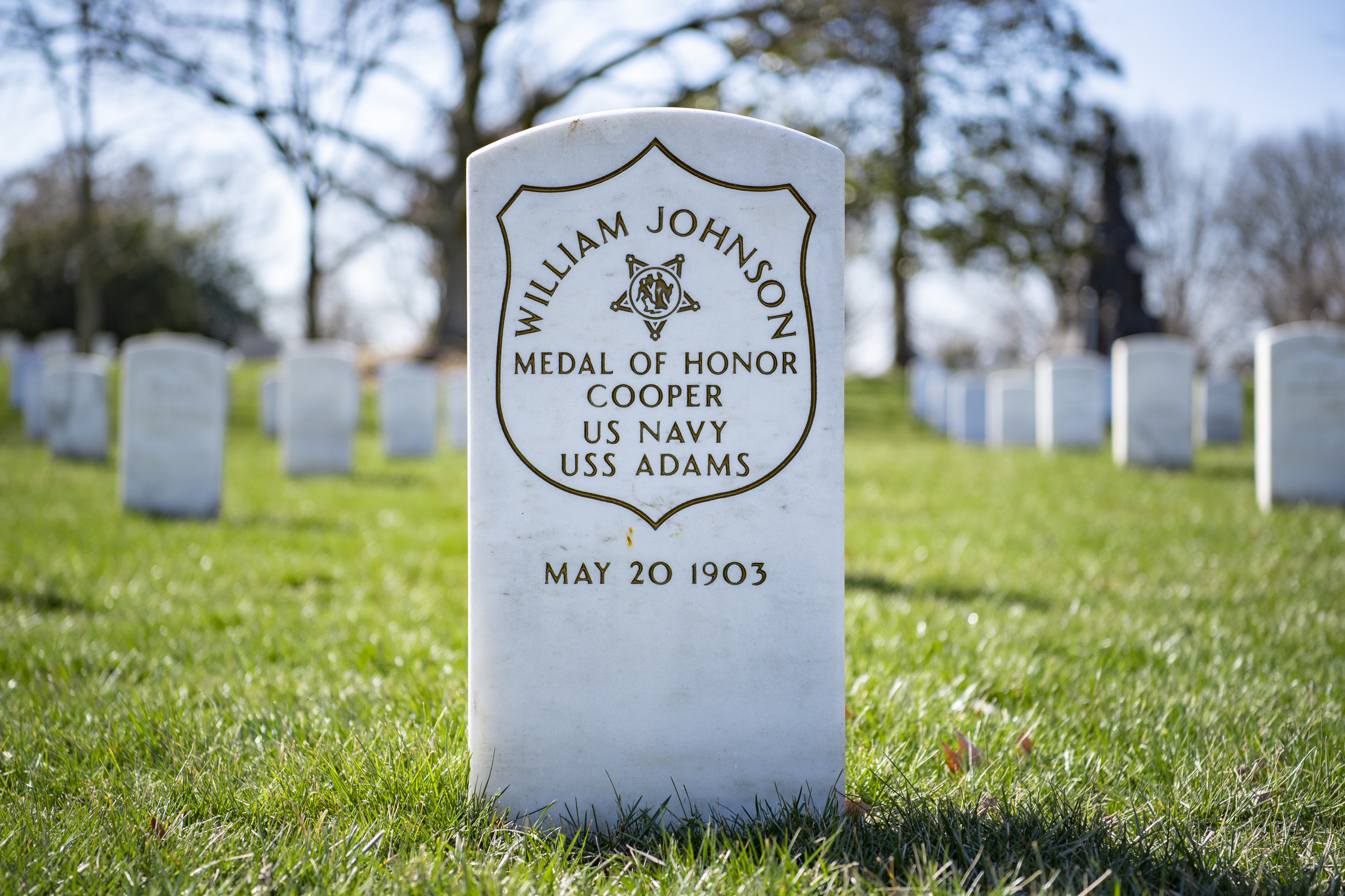
- Grave at Arlington National Cemetery
- Born: 1855; Saint Vincent
- Died: May 20, 1903 (aged 47–48); Washington, D.C., U.S.
- Burial place: Arlington National Cemetery
- Military career
- Allegiance: United States of America
- Branch: United States Navy
- Rank: Cooper
- Unit: USS Adams
- Awards: Medal of Honor

William Johnson (1855 – May 20, 1903) was a United States Navy sailor and a recipient of America's highest military decoration, the Medal of Honor.

== Biography ==
Willian Johnson was born in 1855 on Saint Vincent island in the West Indies.

On November 14, 1879, Johnson was serving as a Cooper on the steamship USS Adams at the Mare Island Naval Shipyard, California, when he "rescued Daniel W. Kloppen, a workman, from drowning." For his actions on that occasion, Cooper Johnson was awarded the Medal of Honor five years later, on October 18, 1884.

Johnson died at age 47 or 48 and was buried at Arlington National Cemetery, Arlington County, Virginia.

== Medal of Honor citation ==
Rank and organization: Cooper, U.S. Navy. Born: 1855, St. Vincent West Indies. Accredited to: New York. G.O. No.: 326, October 18, 1884.

Citation

Citation: Serving on board the U.S.S. Adams at the Navy Yard, Mare Island, Calif., 14 November 1879, Johnson rescued Daniel W. Kloppen, a workman, from drowning.

== See also ==
- List of Medal of Honor recipients
- List of Medal of Honor recipients during Peacetime
- List of African American Medal of Honor recipients
