= Philip Moore (Medal of Honor) =

- Born: c. 1853; Newfoundland
- Died: 1902 (aged 48–49)
- Burial place: Malden, Massachusetts
- Military career
- Allegiance: United States of America
- Branch: United States Navy
- Rank: Seaman
- Unit: USS Trenton
- Awards: Medal of Honor

Philip Moore (c. 1853–1902) was a United States Navy sailor and a recipient of the United States military's highest decoration, the Medal of Honor.

== Biography ==
Born in about 1853 in Newfoundland Colony, Moore immigrated to the United States and joined the Navy from Rhode Island. By September 21, 1880, he was serving as a seaman on the USS Trenton. On that day, while Trenton was at Genoa, Italy, he and Seaman John Russell jumped overboard and rescued Ordinary Seaman Hans Paulsen from drowning. For this action, both Moore and Russell were awarded the Medal of Honor four years later, on October 18, 1884.

Moore's official Medal of Honor citation reads:

For jumping overboard from the U.S.S. Trenton, at Genoa, Italy, 21 September 1880, and rescuing from drowning Hans Paulsen, ordinary seaman.

== See also ==
- List of Medal of Honor recipients during peacetime
