= Melvin Morris =

United States Army veteran (born 1942)

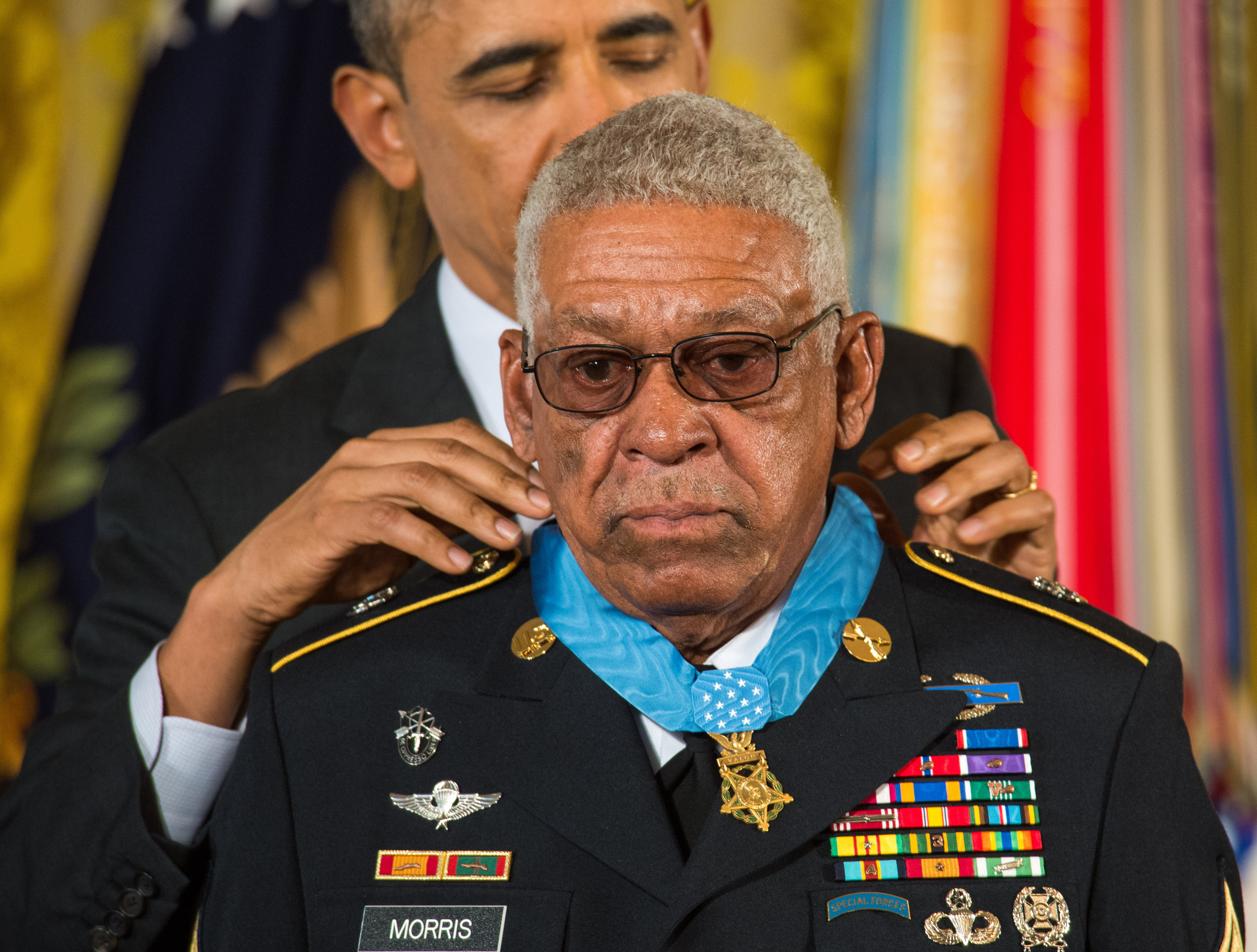
- Morris receiving the Medal of Honor from President Obama in 2014.
- Born: January 7, 1942 (age 84); Okmulgee, Oklahoma, US
- Military career
- Allegiance: United States
- Branch: United States Army
- Service years: 1959–1985
- Rank: Sergeant First Class
- Units: Company D, 5th Special Forces Group; 1st Special Forces Command (Airborne)
- Conflicts: Vietnam War
- Awards: Medal of Honor; Bronze Star Medal (2); Purple Heart (2); Meritorious Service Medal; Air Medal; Army Commendation Medal (2) with "V" device

Melvin Morris (born January 7, 1942) is a United States Army veteran of the Vietnam War, a Special Forces soldier, and a recipient of the Medal of Honor.

== Early life, Military Career, Later Life ==
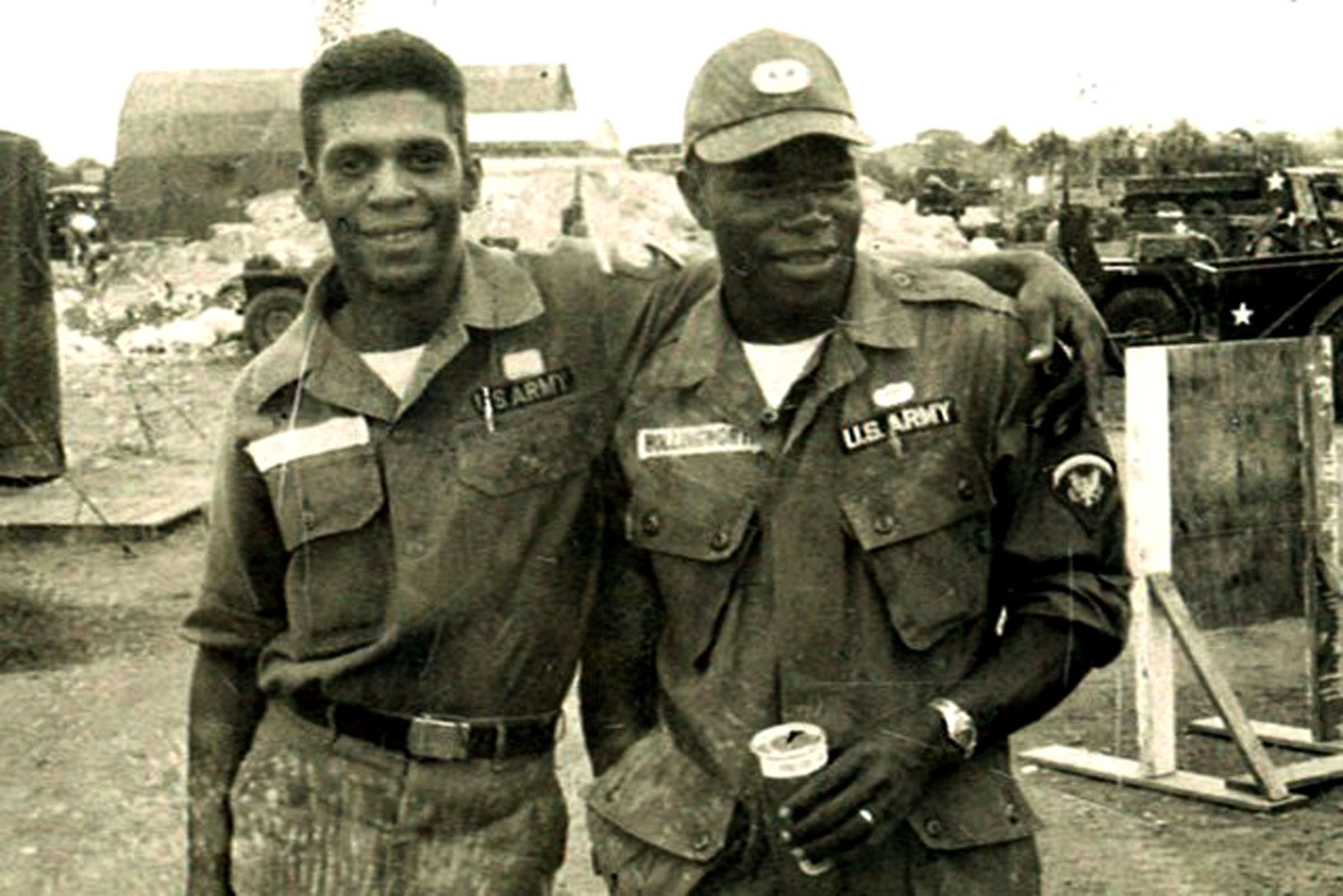
Morris (left) with a comrade in Vietnam

Morris was born in Okmulgee, Oklahoma, on January 7, 1942. In 1959 Morris joined the Oklahoma Army National Guard and soon after joined the active duty United States Army.

In 1961, Morris became one of the first US Army soldiers to qualify as a Green Beret at Fort Bragg, North Carolina. He twice volunteered for tours in South Vietnam.

Morris retired from the US Army with the rank of Sergeant First Class.

Morris appeared in the Spring 2019 issue of the American Battlefield Trust's magazine Hallowed Ground, writing about his visit to Fort Wagner, near Charleston, South Carolina, where Sergeant William Harvey Carney earned his Medal of Honor while serving with the 54th Massachusetts in 1863.

In December 1990, Morris and his family settled in Brevard County, Florida.

== Medal of Honor action ==
Morris received the Medal of Honor for his valorous actions on September 17, 1969, while commanding the Third Company, Third Battalion of the IV Mobile Strike Force near Chi Lăng, South Vietnam. Then-Staff Sergeant Morris led an advance across enemy lines to recover the body of a fallen sergeant. Morris single-handedly destroyed with a bag of grenades an enemy force in a series of bunkers which was pinning down his battalion. Morris was shot three times during that engagement.

Morris received the Medal of Honor from President Barack Obama in a March 18, 2014 ceremony in the White House. The award came through the Defense Authorization Act, which called for a congressionally-mandated review of minorities including Jewish American and Hispanic American veterans from World War II, the Korean War and the Vietnam War to ensure that no prejudice was shown to those deserving the Medal of Honor.

== Medal of Honor Citation ==

The President of the United States of America, authorized by Act of Congress, July 9, 1918 (amended by act of July 25, 1963), takes pride in presenting the Medal of Honor to:

MELVIN MORRIS
United States Army

For conspicuous gallantry and intrepidity at the risk of his life above and beyond the call of duty:

Staff Sergeant Melvin Morris distinguished himself by acts of gallantry and intrepidity above and beyond the call of duty while serving as Commander of a Strike Force drawn from Company D, 5th Special Forces Group (Airborne), 1st Special Forces, during combat operations against an armed enemy in the vicinity of Chi Lang, Republic of Vietnam on September 17, 1969.

On that afternoon, Staff Sergeant Morris' affiliated companies encountered an extensive enemy mine field and were subsequently engaged by a hostile force. Staff Sergeant Morris learned by radio that a fellow team commander had been killed near an enemy bunker and he immediately reorganized his men into an effective assault posture before advancing forward and splitting off with two men to recover the team commander's body. Observing the maneuver, the hostile force concentrated its fire on Staff Sergeant Morris' three-man element and successfully wounded both men accompanying him. After assisting the two wounded men back to his forces' lines, Staff Sergeant Morris charged forward into withering enemy fire with only his men's suppressive fire as cover. While enemy machine gun emplacements continuously directed strafing fusillades against him, Staff Sergeant Morris destroyed the positions with hand grenades and continued his assault, ultimately eliminating four bunkers. Upon reaching the bunker nearest the fallen team commander, Staff Sergeant Morris repulsed the enemy, retrieved his comrade and began the arduous trek back to friendly lines. He was wounded three times as he struggled forward, but ultimately succeeded in returning his fallen comrade to a friendly position.

Staff Sergeant Morris' extraordinary heroism and selflessness above and beyond the call of duty are in keeping with the highest traditions of military service and reflect great credit upon himself, his unit, and the United States Army.

== Other awards ==
SFC Morris' awards include:

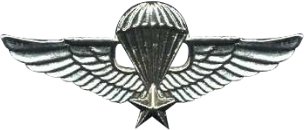

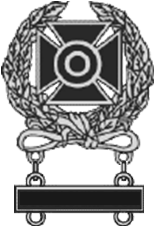

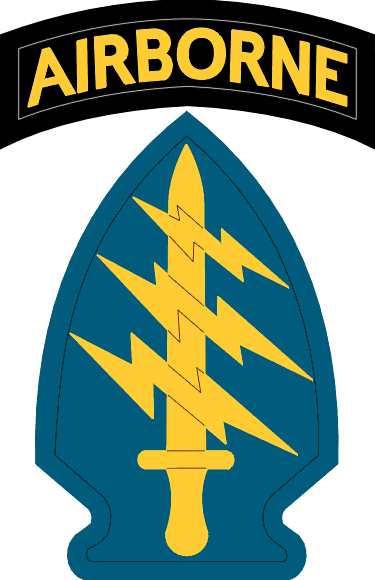

| Badge | Combat Infantryman Badge | | |
| 1st Row | Medal of Honor (Upgraded from Distinguished Service Cross) | Bronze Star with 1 Oak leaf cluster | Purple Heart with 1 Oak leaf cluster |
| 2nd Row | Meritorious Service Medal | Air Medal | Army Commendation Medal with "V" device and 1 Oak leaf cluster |
| 3rd Row | Army Good Conduct Medal with silver clasp and 1 loop (6 awards) | National Defense Service Medal | Armed Forces Expeditionary Medal |
| 4th Row | Vietnam Service Medal with 1 silver Campaign star | NCO Professional Development Ribbon with award numeral 3 | Army Service Ribbon |
| 5th Row | Army Overseas Service Ribbon with award numeral 4 | Vietnamese Gallantry Cross with 1 Bronze star | Vietnam Campaign Medal with 1960— device |
| Badges | South Vietnamese Parachutist badge | Master Parachutist Badge | Expert Marksmanship badge with rifle component bar |
| Badges | Special Forces Tab | United States Army Special Forces; Distinctive unit insignia | United States Army Special Forces; Combat Service Identification Badge |
