= USS Peoria (1898) =

Gunboat of the United States Navy

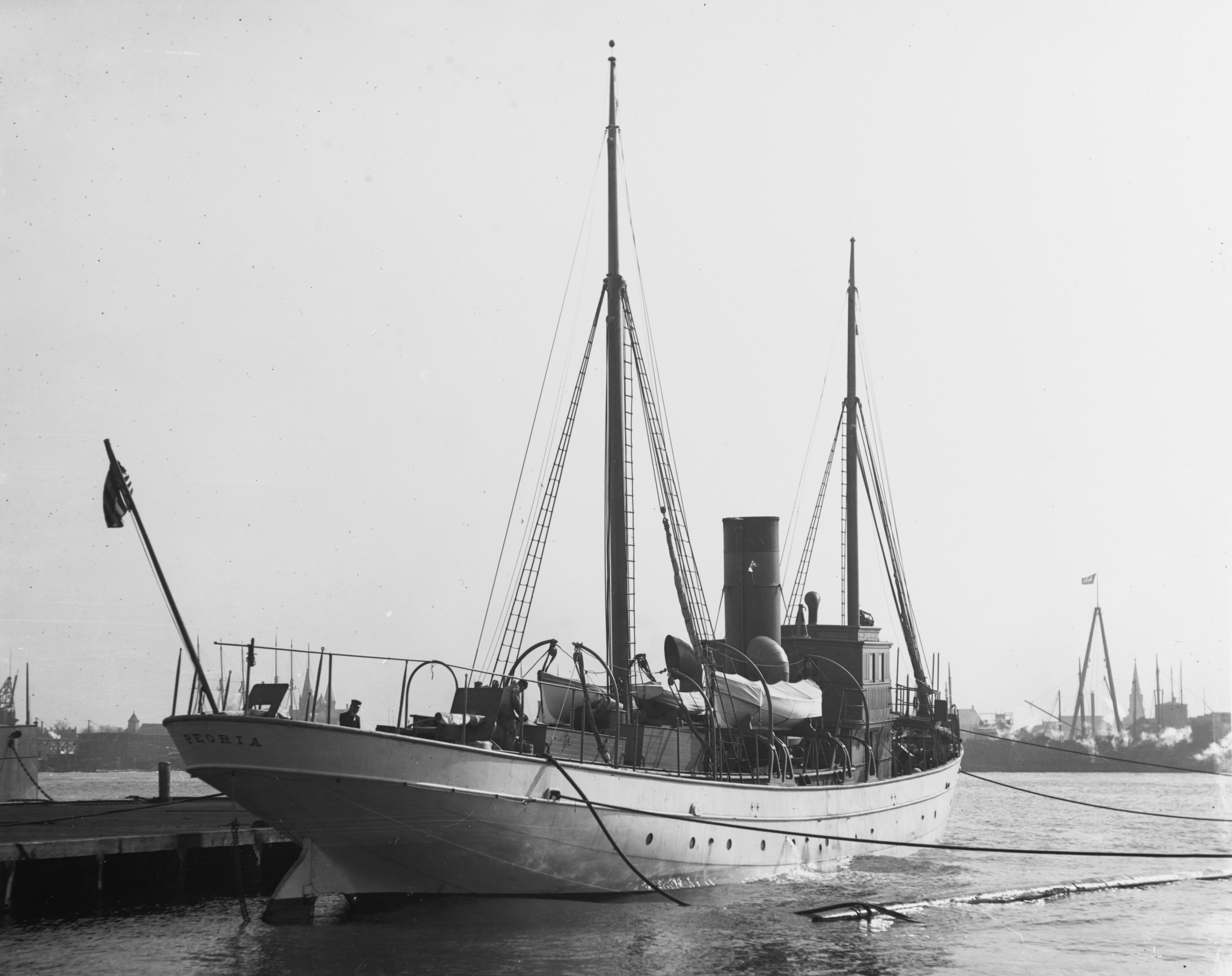
- USS Peoria (1898) at the Boston Navy Yard, Charlestown, Massachusetts on 19 February 1901.

History

United States
- Name: USS Peoria
- Namesake: Peoria, Illinois
- Builder: Neafie & Levy, Philadelphia, Pennsylvania
- Launched: 19 March 1897
- Completed: 1896
- Acquired: 23 May 1898
- Commissioned: 15 May 1898
- Decommissioned: 10 November 1921
- Renamed: From Philadelphia to Peoria
- Fate: Sold 16 June 1922

General characteristics
- Displacement: 487 long tons (495 t)
- Length: 131 ft 11 in (40.21 m)
- Beam: 25 ft 11 in (7.90 m)
- Draft: 10.5 ft 8 in (3.40 m)
- Speed: 9 knots (17 km/h; 10 mph)
- Armament: 4 x 3-pounder Hotchkiss rapid-fire guns; 1 x 6 mm machine gun

The Peoria, a converted steel gunboat, was built as the pilot boat Philadelphia by Neafie and Levy ship and engine building company in Philadelphia, Pennsylvania in March 1896 for the Pennsylvania and Delaware Pilots' Association. The Philadelphia was purchased by the US Navy on 23 May 1898 from the Philadelphia Pilots' Association, and was renamed Peoria. She was commissioned on 15 May 1898.

== Service history ==
Peoria sailed from Key West, Florida, 25 June 1898, escorting two transports, the steamships Florida and Fanita, carrying a joint Cuban-U.S. landing force. The forces on board these steamships consisted of about 200 Cubans under General Emilio Núñez, 50 troopers of the Tenth United States Cavalry under Lieutenant Johnson, and 17 volunteers under Mr. Winthrop Chanler. There were also on board about 700 tons of munitions of war and supplies, including 4,000 small arms, ammunition, two dynamite field pieces, clothing, etc.

A landing was attempted on the south coast of Cuba 29 June, but Spanish army forces were so overwhelmingly strong in this area that another landing point had to be selected. Steaming further east, the transports debarked their troops the following day west of Tunas, at the mouth of the Tayabacao River. As the landing boats reached the beach, a "very destructive" fire was opened on them by Spanish infantry concealed in camouflaged earthworks. As soon as the enemy's positions could be located, Peoria opened a "very rapid and accurate fire," which soon silenced them. For the rest of the day, Peoria's guns prevented the destruction of the outnumbered landing force, her shells having a telling effect on the well-entrenched defenders. The landing force was later safely withdrawn under cover of darkness.

Joining gunboat Helena 2 July 1898, Peoria engaged Spanish shore batteries newly entrenched around Tunas. Suffering minor damage, the gunboats silenced the batteries, dismounted some guns, and sank several enemy-flag schooners.

On the following day, the expedition was successfully landed at Palo Alto, east of Tunas, where the troops made contact with Cuban insurgent forces. Peoria then escorted the two transports back to Key West. Hostilities in the Caribbean ended 13 August 1898; Peoria continued her peacetime service in the West Indies into 1899, when she sailed for Boston.

From 1899 through 1904, Peoria, still classed as an "auxiliary gunboat," served on the East Coast. Originally at Boston, she later acted as tender to gunnery training ship Puritan before being based at the Naval Torpedo Station, Newport, Rhode Island. Here she assisted in conducting experiments with improved torpedoes for the growing submarine and destroyer forces as well as for capital ships.

On 24 January 1905, Peoria arrived at San Juan, Puerto Rico. For the next six years she operated from San Juan, being redesignated in 1908 as a "steel steam tug." In December 1911 she sailed to Charleston, South Carolina, where she was disarmed for local service. The next ten years were devoted to towing and harbor service at Charleston and at Key West, with temporary duty at Guantánamo Bay and Santo Domingo.

== End of service ==
Peoria was designated a fleet tug (AT-48) in July 1920; on 30 January 1921 she decommissioned at Key West. Recommissioned 14 April 1921, she became a district tug (YT-109) in June and served at Key West for the next four months. She decommissioned once more at New York 10 November 1921, and was sold there 16 June 1922.
