= USS Jamestown (1844) =

Cargo ship of the United States Navy

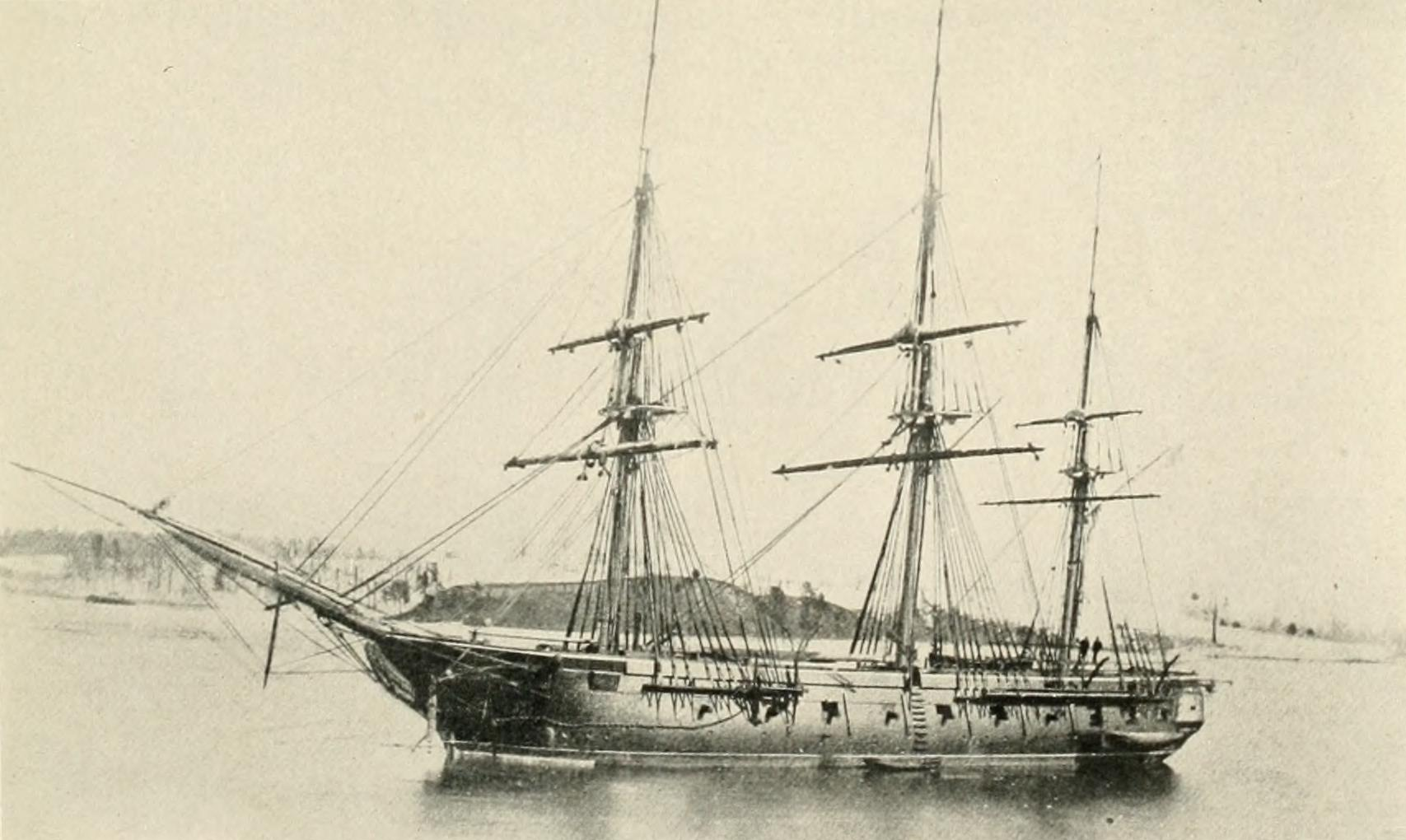
- USS Jamestown

History

United States
- Name: USS Jamestown
- Namesake: Jamestown, Virginia
- Launched: 1844
- Commissioned: 12 December 1844
- Decommissioned: 11 May 1854
- Fate: Became a Marine Hospital, destroyed in a fire on 3 January 1913
- Recommissioned: 22 February 1855
- Decommissioned: 2 June 1857
- Recommissioned: 16 December 1857
- Decommissioned: 14 February 1860
- Recommissioned: 5 June 1861
- Decommissioned: 17 September 1865
- Recommissioned: 3 September 1866
- Decommissioned: 13 August 1868
- Recommissioned: 25 January 1869
- Decommissioned: 7 October 1871
- Recommissioned: 16 March 1876
- Decommissioned: 3 March 1879
- Recommissioned: 8 May 1879
- Decommissioned: 21 September 1881
- Recommissioned: 14 February 1882
- Decommissioned: 31 August 1888
- Recommissioned: 13 April 1889
- Decommissioned: 6 September 1892
- Fate: Served as a Marine Hospital; Destroyed by fire 3 January 1913

General characteristics
- Type: Sloop
- Displacement: 1,150 long tons (1,168 t)
- Length: 163 ft 6 in (49.83 m)
- Beam: 32 ft 2 in (9.80 m)
- Depth: 17 ft 3 in (5.26 m)
- Complement: 186 officers and sailors
- Armament: 4 × 8 in (200 mm) guns; 18 × 32-pounder guns

The first USS Jamestown was a sloop-of-war in the United States Navy during the Mexican–American War and the American Civil War.

Jamestown was launched in 1844 by the Gosport Navy Yard, Virginia; and commissioned there on 12 December, with Commander Robert B. Cunningham in command.

== Service history ==
=== Africa, Ireland, 1845–1850 ===
She departed Hampton Roads on 25 June 1845 as flagship of Commodore Charles W. Skinner in command of United States naval vessels operating off the western coast of Africa to suppress the slave trade. At the end of her first deployment the sloop arrived at Boston, Massachusetts on 6 August 1846.

While she was moored at the Boston Navy Yard word reached the United States that for the second consecutive year blight had ruined the potato crop of Ireland, depriving the people of that country of their chief means of subsistence. A joint resolution of Congress approved 3 March 1847 authorized the Secretary of the Navy to place Jamestown and Macedonian at the disposal of Captains Robert Bennet Forbes and George Coleman De Kay to carry food to the starving poor of Ireland. Jamestown sailed from Boston on 28 March and arrived at Cork, Ireland on 12 April. After unloading her life-saving cargo, the sloop returned to Boston on 17 May.

As flagship of Commodore William Compton Bolton, Jamestown again stood out of Boston on 22 July to operate on the west coast of Africa. A year later she was transferred to the Mediterranean Squadron to assist in protecting American citizens and interests during the epidemic of revolutions which convulsed Europe in 1848. After political conditions became more stable, Jamestown returned to Norfolk, Virginia on 4 May 1850.

=== South America, Africa, West Indies, 1851–1860 ===
After a year at home, she was assigned to the Brazil Squadron departing Norfolk on 1 June 1851 to begin operations off South America lasting until her return to Philadelphia Navy Yard on 2 May 1854. She decommissioned there nine days later.

Recommissioning on 22 February 1855, Jamestown sailed as flagship of the African Squadron under Commodore Thomas Crabbe, departing Key West on 9 June and returning to Philadelphia on 2 June 1857 and decommissioning. She re-commissioned on 16 December and cruised the West Indies with the Home Squadron until decommissioning at Philadelphia, Pennsylvania on 14 February 1860.

=== Civil War, 1861–1865 ===
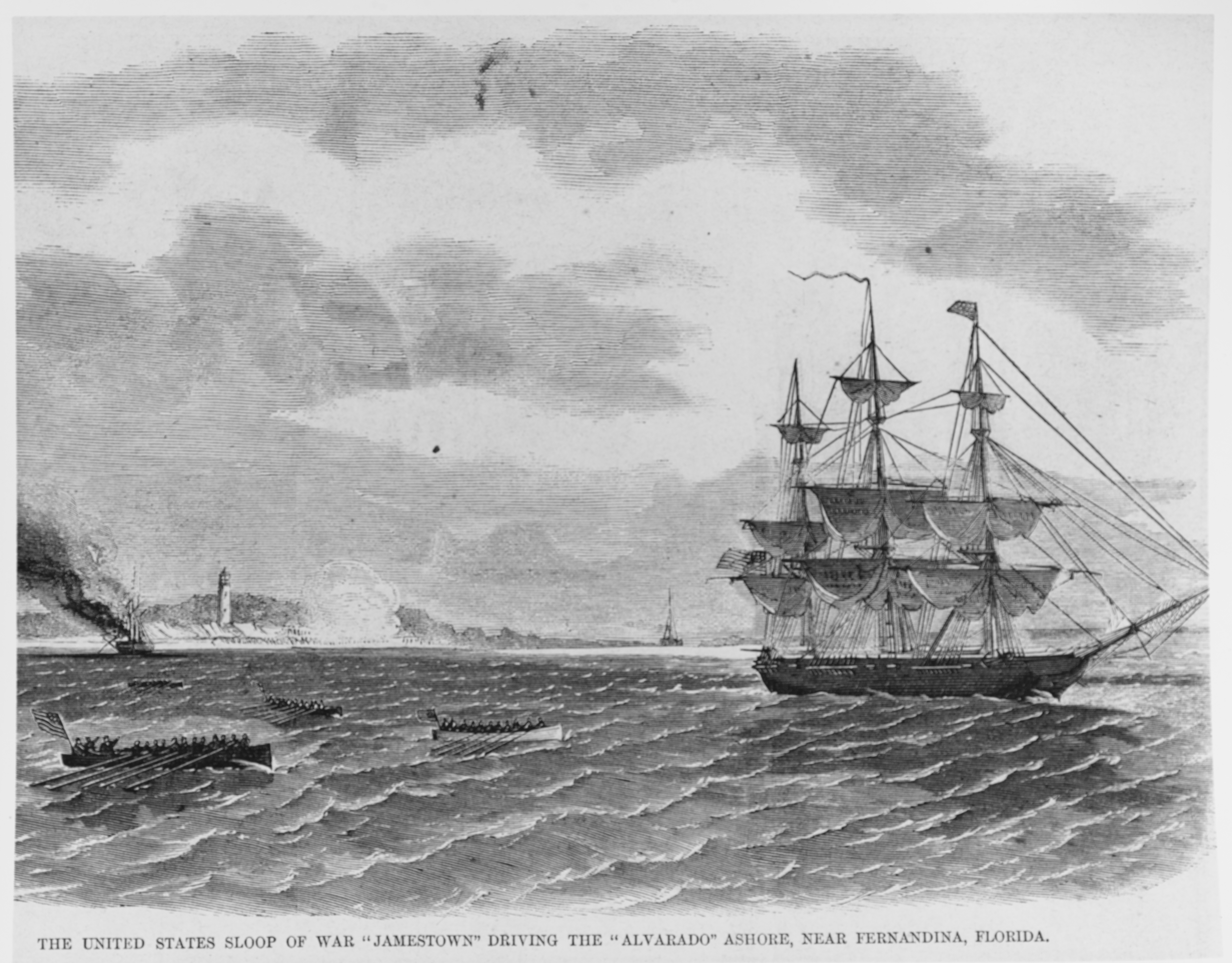
USS Jamestown, right foreground, burns the bark Alvarado, in the distance at left, near Fernandina, Florida, on 5 August 1861. Illustration from Harper's Weekly, 28 September 1861.

After the outbreak of the Civil War, Jamestown re-commissioned on 5 June 1861 and was assigned to the Atlantic Blockading Squadron, where she compiled a record of outstanding efficiency. The sloop chased the bark Alvarado ashore off Fernandina, Florida and set her on fire on 5 August, and captured the schooner Aigburth off the coast of Florida on 31 August 1861. Four days later she captured, dismantled, and scuttled the schooner Colonel Long. Next she captured the schooner Havelock on 15 December. Her final prize was the brig Intended, taken off Wilmington, North Carolina on 1 May 1862.

Jamestown departed for the Pacific on 12 October to protect American commerce from Confederate privateers; and she remained on that duty until after the end of the war, decommissioning at Mare Island on 17 September 1865.

=== Pacific, 1866–1881 ===
Having been converted to a transport and store ship, she recommissioned on 3 September 1866 to serve at Panama as a store and hospital ship. Because of fever on board, Jamestown was ordered north on 2 April 1867 and was disinfected at San Francisco, California. Joining the North Pacific Squadron, she served as guard and storeship at Sitka, Alaska, from 11 September 1867 until 30 May 1868. Jamestown was present at the hoisting of the U.S. Flag at Sitka on 18 October 1867 after Alaska was purchased from Russia.

Jamestown arrived at Mare Island on 23 July 1868; decommissioned there on 13 August; and recommissioned on 25 January 1869, following repairs. For almost three years, Jamestown cruised the Pacific on the west coasts of North and South America, and as far west as Tahiti and the Fiji and Hawaiian Islands.

Decommissioning on 7 October 1871, Jamestown was placed in ordinary at Mare Island until 16 March 1876 when she recommissioned for use as a State Public Marine School. She was used as training ship in San Francisco from 1876 to 1879. Youth of age from the San Francisco Industrial School were trained in navigation and seamanship. Outcry of the public forced the closure of the training ship. She operated at the Hawaiian Islands in this capacity until she was returned to the Navy Department and decommissioned on 3 March 1879.

She was recommissioned on 8 May and sailed for Sitka, Alaska, where she surveyed the harbor and protected American interests. In 1881, she sailed the Pacific until decommissioning at San Francisco on 21 September.

=== Training and hospital ship, 1882–1913 ===
Having been fitted out as an apprentice training ship, Jamestown recommissioned on 14 February 1882 and proceeded to the Atlantic coast via Cape Horn. In her new capacity, she sailed the Atlantic Ocean, voyaging to the West Indies, Spain, and as far north as the State of Maine. While at the Brooklyn Navy Yard on 20 December 1883, Landsman J. W. Norris and Ordinary Seaman Robert Augustus Sweeney jumped overboard and rescued a man from drowning, for which they were each awarded the Medal of Honor. On 31 August 1888, Jamestown decommissioned at Norfolk.

Recommissioning 13 April 1889, Jamestown cruised to France and to the West Indies with apprentices, and decommissioned again on 6 September 1892 at Norfolk.

On 9 September she was transferred to the Treasury Department for Marine Hospital Service for quarantine purposes in Hampton Roads. She was destroyed by fire at the Norfolk Navy Yard on 3 January 1913, after being returned to the Navy Department.
