= USS Trenton (1876) =

US Navy frigate (1876–1889)

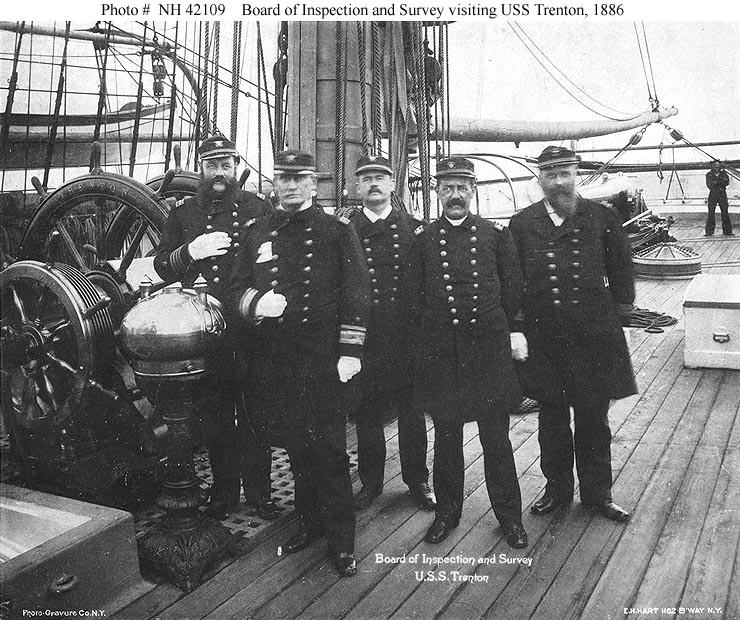
- Admiral James Edward Jouett (second from left) and others inspecting USS Trenton in 1886

History

United States
- Name: USS Trenton
- Namesake: Trenton, New Jersey
- Builder: New York Navy Yard, Brooklyn, New York
- Laid down: 1875
- Launched: 1 January 1876
- Commissioned: 14 February 1877
- Decommissioned: 9 November 1881
- Recommissioned: 19 September 1883
- Decommissioned: 17 September 1886
- Recommissioned: 16 May 1887
- Fate: Wrecked 16 March 1889
- Stricken: 13 April 1891

General characteristics
- Type: Screw steamer
- Displacement: 3,800 long tons (3,900 t)
- Length: 253 ft (77 m)
- Beam: 48 ft (15 m)
- Draft: 20 ft 6 in (6.25 m)
- Propulsion: Steam engine
- Speed: 14 kn (16 mph; 26 km/h)
- Complement: 477 officers and enlisted
- Armament: 11 × 8 in (200 mm) muzzle-loading rifles, 2 × 20 pdr (9.1 kg) breech-loading rifles

The first USS Trenton was a wooden-hulled screw steamer, classified as a screw frigate, in the United States Navy. She was named for Trenton, New Jersey.

Trenton was laid down by the New York Navy Yard in 1875; launched on 1 January 1876; sponsored by Miss Katherine M. Parker; and commissioned on 14 February 1877, Captain John Lee Davis in command.

The Trenton was the first US naval vessel to use electric lights, which were installed in 1883.

== Mediterranean (1877–1881) ==
Trenton departed New York on 8 March 1877 and reached Villefranche, France on 18 April. The following day, Rear Admiral John L. Worden broke his flag in her, and she became flagship of the European Station. A week after, she reached the Mediterranean, Russia declared war on Turkey. Consequently, Trenton and the other ships of the squadron alternated tours of duty in the eastern Mediterranean protecting U.S. citizens and other foreign nationals resident in or visiting Turkish possessions. On 9 May, she departed Villefranche for Smyrna, Turkey, and – but for a run to Salonika from 9–13 June with Marion – remained there until 25 August, when the flagship left the eastern Mediterranean behind to return to Villefranche. Next, Trenton visited Marseille for two weeks in mid-September; then steamed back to Villefranche on the 18th and remained there until Christmas Day, when she put to sea to return to the eastern Mediterranean. Reentering Smyrna on the second day of 1878, she showed the flag there until 16 March, when she sailed for Piraeus, the port-city for Athens, Greece. On 2 April, she got underway again for Villefranche, touching at La Spezia and Leghorn in Italy en route.

On 17 July 1878, she headed for Gibraltar, and on the 24th exited the Mediterranean. She cruised north, visited Lisbon, Portugal; Cherbourg, France; and Yarmouth, England; and then returned to the Mediterranean, reaching Villefranche in mid-October. Trenton resumed her cruises between Mediterranean ports, adding Genoa, Naples, and Tangiers to her itinerary in the spring of 1879. In June, she again headed out through the Strait of Gibraltar to visit Portsmouth, England; Terneuzen, Netherlands; Antwerp, Belgium; and Copenhagen, Denmark. She was back at Villefranche late in September. In mid-November, she sailed to Gibraltar and waited there until 7 December for Constellation to arrive with Trenton's replacement crew. The warship remained in the western Mediterranean until early April 1880.

On 3 April 1880, she headed east once more. After stops at Naples and at Alexandria, Egypt, the warship began cruising the Aegean again. She visited Smyrna, Tenedos, and Chamak Kelessi in Turkey as well as Piraeus before returning to Villefranche on 25 May. After a visit to Marseille on 7 June, the flagship left the Mediterranean for the third time during this deployment and made another cruise to English, Belgian, and Dutch ports. Four of Trenton's crew rescued fellow sailors from drowning during this period, for which they were awarded the Medal of Honor: Seamen Philip Moore and John Russell at Genoa, Italy, on 21 September 1880, and Ordinary Seaman John Davis and Seaman Alexander Haure Turvelin at Toulon, France, in February 1881.

Trenton returned to the western Mediterranean in August and operated there until 7 September 1881, when she sailed for the U.S. She arrived in Hampton Roads on 12 October, and three days later moved up the York River for the Yorktown centennial celebration. On 22 October, the warship departed Yorktown and the following day arrived in the New York Navy Yard. There, she was decommissioned on 9 November 1881.

== Pioneer in electricity for US Naval vessels (1883) ==
Trenton was the first U.S. Navy ship to have electric lights. A dynamo, engine, and lights were installed in the summer of 1883. The successful use of electricity on this ship led to the installation of electricity on the first ships of the New Steel Navy.

== Far East (1883–1886) ==
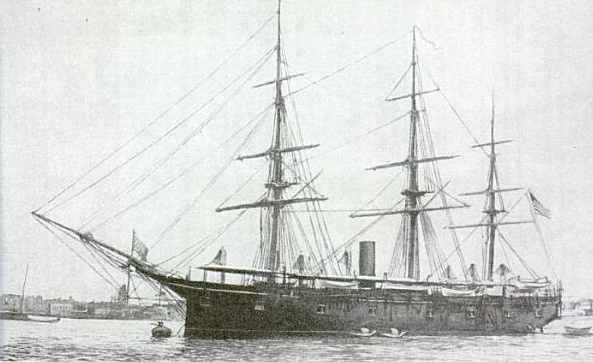
USS Trenton with the Asiatic Squadron

Reactivated on 18 September 1883, Trenton departed New York in November for duty on the Asiatic Station. Steaming via the Mediterranean, the Suez Canal, Ceylon, and Singapore, she arrived at Hong Kong on 1 May 1884 to begin two years of cruising in the Far East. She visited ports in China, Korea, and Japan, carrying out various diplomatic missions. On occasion, Trenton sent landing parties ashore in China and Korea to protect American nationals and other foreigners during periods of internal unrest. The warship completed this tour of duty in the spring of 1886; departed Yokohama, Japan on 9 May; retraced her voyage back across the Indian Ocean, through the Suez Canal and the Mediterranean Sea, and across the Atlantic to reach Hampton Roads on 2 September. She entered the Norfolk Navy Yard on 9 September and was decommissioned for repairs on 17 September 1886.

== Pacific (1887–1889) ==
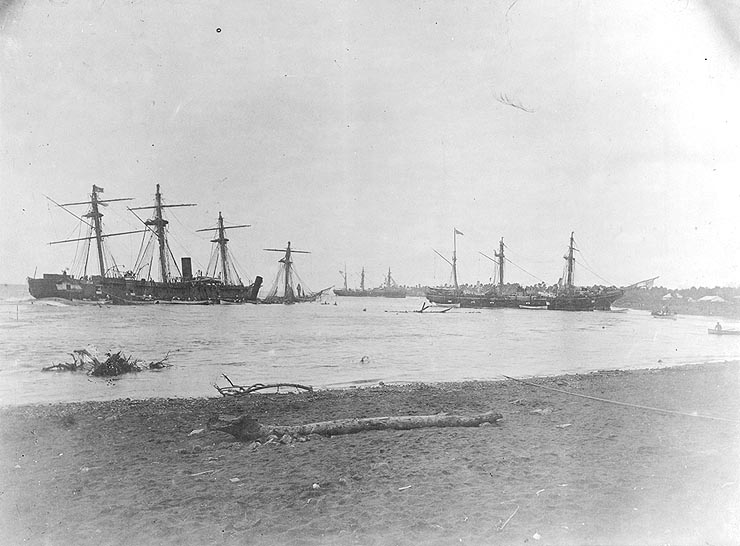
Wrecked ships in Apia Harbor, Upolu, Samoa, soon after the storm. The view looks about northward, with Trenton and the sunken Vandalia at left, the German corvette Olga beached in the center distance and Nipsic beached in the right center. Trenton's starboard quarter gallery has been largely ripped away.

On 16 May 1887, she was placed in commission once again. On 25 July, she exited Hampton Roads and headed south for Brazil. En route, Trenton stopped at St. Vincent in the Windward Islands and entered Rio de Janeiro on 10 September for a fortnight visit. After touching at St. Thomas on the return voyage, she dropped anchor in New York harbor on 3 November.

Almost three months later, on 30 January 1888, Trenton sailed for the Pacific. The voyage took her more than a year to complete, for she had to steam around Cape Horn at the southern end of South America. After stops at Panama and Tahiti, the warship reached Apia, Samoa, on 10 March 1889 and joined other units of the Pacific Squadron. Six days later, on 16 March 1889, a cyclone struck Apia and the thirteen ships anchored in her harbor.

For thirty-six hours, the storm ravaged the harbor. The Trenton, having lost steam and rudder, was in imminent danger of foundering on the reef. An unusual maneuver suggested by Lieutenant Robert M. G. Brown, Trenton's navigator, is credited for saving the flag ship from complete destruction. Trenton's commander, Norman von Heldreich Farquhar, ordered every man into the port rigging. With the wind striking against the compact mass of bodies, which acted as a sail, the vessel was steered away from the reef and into the bay. Trenton collided with the SMS Olga and then floated toward the sinking Vandalia. With her crew still in the rigging, the approach was slowed and another collision avoided with the Trenton safely maneuvered alongside the Vandalia. The Vandalia's crew escaped to deck of the Trenton, saving many lives that might otherwise have been lost. Both ships were later abandoned.

Out of 450 men on the crew of Trenton, only one life (Landsman J. Hewlett) was lost. Trenton was declared a total loss, and her name was struck from the Naval Vessel Register on 13 April 1891.
