= Emilio Núñez =

Cuban-American and politician (1855–1922)

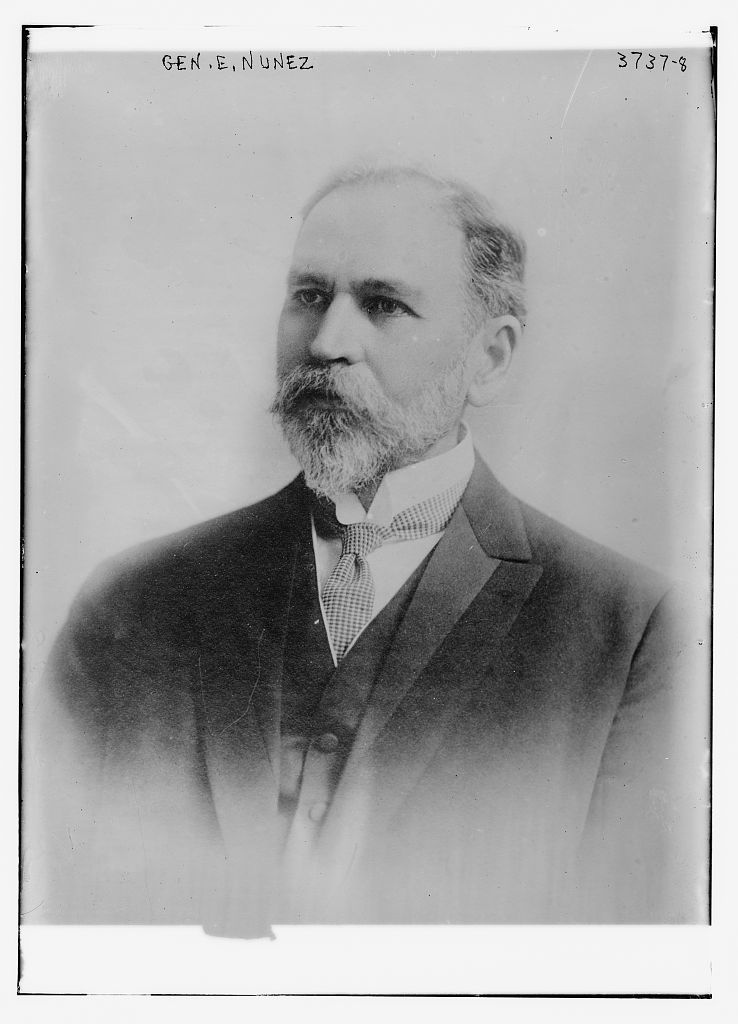
- Juan Emilio de la Caridad Núñez y Rodriguez circa 1915

5th Vice President of Cuba
- In office 20 May 1917 – 20 May 1921
- President: Mario García Menocal
- Preceded by: Enrique José Varona
- Succeeded by: Francisco Carrillo Morales

Personal details
- Born: 27 December 1855 Esperanza (Ranchuelo), Villa Clara, Cuba
- Died: 5 May 1922 (aged 66) Havana, Cuba

Military service
- Allegiance: Cuba
- Branch/service: Cuban Liberation Army
- Battles/wars: Ten Years' War; Little War; Cuban War of Independence

Emilio Núñez (born Juan Emilio de la Caridad Núñez y Rodriguez on 27 December 1855 in Esperanza, Las Villas, Cuba – 5 May 1922 in Havana, Cuba) was a Cuban-American soldier, dentist, and politician.

== Early life and education ==
Núñez graduated in 1889 from the University of Pennsylvania and was a dental surgeon in Philadelphia.

At an early age, he joined the Cuban Revolutionary Army and fought in the "Guerra de Diez Años" (Ten Years' War) attaining the rank of colonel. He was captured and imprisoned in El Morro Castle, where he escaped, and returned to organize a rebel group to operate in San Diego del Valle until 1880, when José Martí convinced him that Cuban independence was not feasible at the moment.

Núñez then went into exile, where he collaborated closely with Martí and became a naturalized U.S. citizen. From the United States he sent arms, ammunition and food to Cuba as Commander in Chief of the Department of Expeditions until 1885. He became a Major-General in the Cuban War of Independence. He organized armed revolutionary expeditions from the United States.

He was one of 31 delegates in the Cuban Constitutional Convention of 1900. He was the Civil Governor of the Province of Havana from 1899 to 1902 and was the first person to raise the flag of Cuba at El Morro Castle on 20 May 1902, at noon.

Núñez served as Cuban Secretary of Agriculture, Commerce and Labor in 1913 and as Vice President of Cuba from 1917 to 1921.

== Family ==
Núñez was the son of Bernardo Núñez y Perez-Labrador and Eulalia Rodriguez y Otero. He was married to Dolores Portuondo y Blez, and they had six children: Bernardo (1886–1967), Julia (1888–1974), Maria Estrella (1890–1926), Ricardo (1893–1973), Emilio Núñez Portuondo (1898–1978) and America (1903–1964). All were born in Philadelphia except America, who was born in Havana.

== Bibliography ==
- Nunez-Portoundo, Ricardo, General Emilio Nunez: Un Procer Cubano, Publicaciones Cultural(1994), ISBN 978-0-9641879-8-6
- Paine, Ralph Delahaye, Roads of Adventure, Houghton Mifflin Company (1922)
- Parker, William Belmont, Cubans of To-Day, G. P. Putnam's Sons (1919)
