= Buffalo Soldier (disambiguation) =

A Buffalo Soldier was a member of one of four original regiments activated in 1866 by the United States Army. Today it refers to the character and nickname of the United States Army soldiers in the 9th and 10th Cavalry units.

- Buffalo Soldiers, the original nickname of the 9th Cavalry Regiment (United States) - active unit.
- Buffalo Soldiers, the original nickname of the 10th Cavalry Regiment (United States) - active unit.
- Buffalo Soldiers, the original nickname of the 24th Infantry Regiment (United States) - inactive unit.
- Buffalo Soldiers, the original nickname of the 25th Infantry Regiment (United States) - inactive unit.
- Buffalo Soldiers, the nickname of the 92nd Infantry Division (United States) - inactive unit
- Buffalo Soldiers, the nickname of the 2nd Cavalry Division (United States) - inactive unit.

Buffalo Soldier or Buffalo Soldiers may also refer to:

- Buffalo Soldier, the article on its history, men and units
- Buffalo Soldier Hill, a summit in New Mexico, US
- "Buffalo Soldier" (song), a Bob Marley song
- Buffalo Soldier (film), 1970 blaxploitation Western film
- Buffalo Soldiers (1997 film), a TNT television film starring Danny Glover about the historical soldiers
- Buffalo Soldiers (2001 film), a satire film about criminal activities of rogue soldiers in West Germany
- Buffalo Soldier, 2014 novel by Tanya Landman, winner of the 2015 Carnegie Medal (literary award)
- MV Buffalo Soldier (T-AK-9301), a United States Navy Military Sealift Command Maritime Prepositioning ship
- Buffalo Soldiers MC, a motorcycle club.
