= Dead Negro =

Dead Negro may refer to:

- Dead Negro Draw, a stream in Texas
- Dead Negro Hollow, a valley in Tennessee
