= Edward L. Baker Jr. =

African-American United States Army Captain

Edward Lee Baker Jr.
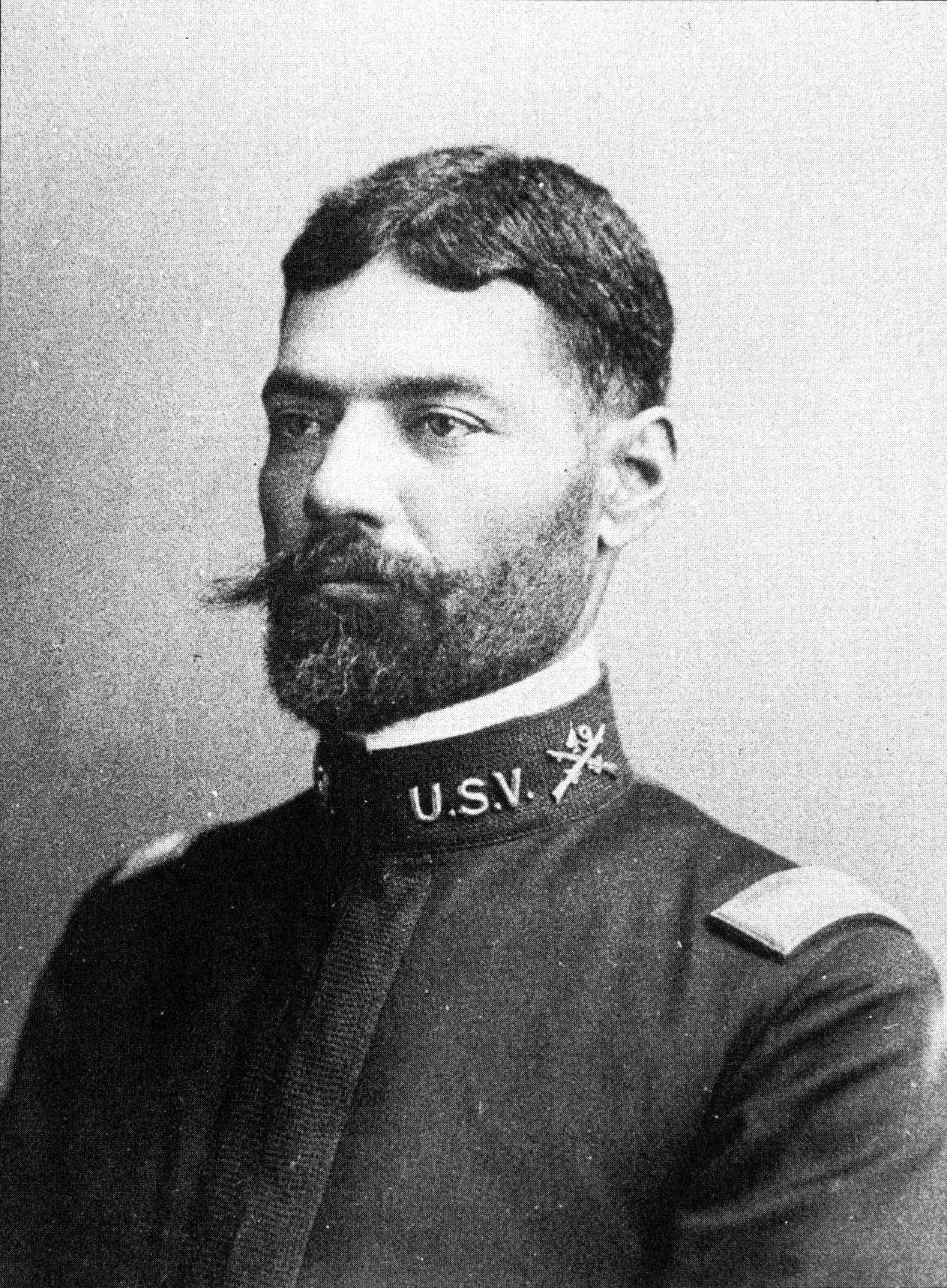
- Edward Baker in the uniform of the United States Volunteers
- Born: December 28, 1865; Laramie County, Territory of Dakota (now Wyoming), US
- Died: August 26, 1913 (aged 47); Los Angeles, California, US
- Burial place: Angelus-Rosedale Cemetery Los Angeles, California
- Military career
- Allegiance: United States
- Branch: United States Army
- Service years: 1882–1901, 1902–1909
- Rank: Captain
- Units: 10th Cavalry Regiment; 10th US Volunteer Infantry; 49th US Volunteer Infantry; Philippine Scouts
- Conflicts: Indian Wars; Spanish–American War; Philippine–American War
- Awards: Medal of Honor

Edward Lee Baker Jr. (December 28, 1865 in Laramie County, Wyoming – August 26, 1913 in Los Angeles) was an African-American United States Army Captain who received the Medal of Honor for actions during the Spanish–American War. While under fire, he rescued a wounded soldier from drowning.

== Legacy ==
He is interred in Angelus-Rosedale Cemetery, which is in Los Angeles, California.

A notable African-American Medal of Honor recipient, Baker is also known for being the maternal grandfather of jazz saxophonist and Oscar nominee Dexter Gordon. He was the father of Gordon's mother, Gwendolyn Baker.

== Military career ==
Baker enlisted as a private in the 9th Cavalry Regiment on 27 July 1882 and was promoted to trumpeter prior to the expiration of his enlistment on 26 July 1887.

On 25 August 1887 he re-enlisted in the 10th Cavalry Regiment where he held the positions of chief trumpeter and quartermaster sergeant prior to being promoted to the rank of sergeant major which made him the highest ranking enlisted man in the regiment.

He fought with the 10th Cavalry at the Battle of San Juan Hill in July 1898. He distinguished himself in the battle and was awarded the Medal of Honor.

He was commissioned as a first lieutenant of the 10 US Volunteer Infantry on 2 August 1898 and was mustered out of service on 8 March 1899.

On 9 September 1899 he was promoted to captain of the 49th US Volunteer Infantry, mustering out with the regiment on 30 June 1901. He was re-commissioned as a second lieutenant with the Philippine Scouts on 7 February 1902 and was promoted to 1st lieutenant on 10 September 1906. He was promoted to the rank of captain on 12 September 1908. He resigned from the army after 27 years of service on 31 October 1909. At the time of his retirement he was one of the highest ranking African-American officers in the United States Army.

== Awards ==
- Medal of Honor
- Indian Campaign Medal
- Spanish Campaign Medal
- Philippine Campaign Medal

=== Medal of Honor citation ===
Rank and Organization: Sergeant Major, 10th U.S. Cavalry. Place and Date: At Santiago, Cuba, July 1, 1898. Birth: Laramie County, Wyoming. Date of Issue: July 3, 1902. Date of Presentation: Unknown

Citation:

The President of the United States of America, in the name of Congress, takes pleasure in presenting the Medal of Honor to Sergeant Major Edward Lee Baker Jr., United States Army, for extraordinary heroism on 1 July 1898, while serving with 10th U.S. Cavalry, in action at Santiago, Cuba. Sergeant Major Baker left cover and, under fire, rescued a wounded comrade from drowning.

== See also ==
- List of Medal of Honor recipients
- List of Medal of Honor recipients for the Spanish–American War
- List of African American Medal of Honor recipients
- Charles Young (United States Army)
