= Horace Bivins =

- Born: Horace Wayman Bivins; May 8, 1866; Accomack County, Virginia
- Died: December 4, 1960 (aged c.94); Billings, Montana, United States
- Military career
- Allegiance: United States
- Branch: United States Army
- Service years: 1887–1913, 1918–1919
- Rank: Captain
- Unit: 10th Cavalry
- Conflicts: Indian Wars; Spanish–American War: Battle of Santiago de Cuba

Horace Wayman Bivins (or Bivens or Bivans or Bevans) (May 8, 1862, Accomack County, Virginia— December 4, 1960, Billings, Montana) was a career soldier and member of the 10th Cavalry in the United States Army. The Indians in the West referred to the African-American unit as Buffalo Soldiers. Bivins gained the rank of sergeant and fought in the Indian Wars and in the Spanish–American War of 1898, receiving a Silver Star for his service in Cuba.

In 1903, he received the first Army Distinguished Pistol Shot badge, retroactively for achievements recorded in 1894. He is also the first U.S. Army Double Distinguished Shooter. He retired in 1913 but returned for a period in the Army after the United States entered World War I, being commissioned as a captain. He retired to Billings, Montana, where he resided with his wife until her death in 1943. He died December 4, 1960, at the age of 94 and is buried in Baltimore National Cemetery.

== Early life ==
Bivins was born free on May 8, 1862, in Accomack County, Virginia; his parents, Severn S. and Elizabeth Bivins, were established as free people of color before the American Civil War and farmed on Virginia's Eastern Shore. Bivins grew up working with them, but decided to attend Hampton Institute in Virginia. In 1887 he joined the United States Army as a private.

== Military career ==
Assigned to the 10th Cavalry, Bivins participated in the campaign against Geronimo in Arizona, known as part of the Indian Wars in the American West. He also fought with the 10th United States Cavalry Regiment against Spanish forces in Cuba in 1898 during the Spanish–American War. Bivins was commended for valor and awarded a Silver Star during the Battle of Santiago de Cuba, during which he suffered a head wound.

In 1899, Bivins was one of the contributors to the book, Under the Fire with the Tenth U.S. Cavalry, covering the experiences of the 10th Cavalry in the war.

After serving at a number of posts, including the Philippines, Bivins retired from the army in 1913. He had "distinguished himself as a national revolver and carbine marksmanship champion, proudly wearing his many awards." During an examination of Army records at some point after the establishment of the Distinguished Pistol Program in 1903, Army personnel determined that then Corporal Horace Waymon Bivins, then assigned to Troop B, 10th U.S. Cavalry Regiment, had won at least three pistol marksmanship championship awards, accomplishing this in 1894. This qualified him for the newly established Distinguished Pistol badge. He was retroactively awarded the first Army Distinguished Pistol Shot badge for his distinction in marksmanship competition. Bivins is the only shooter to have been retroactively awarded the medal for accomplishments before 1903. In 1894 Corporal Bivins had also been awarded the United States Army Distinguished Rifle Badge and, in doing so, became the first United States Army Double Distinguished Shooter, an extremely rare honor.

Bivins briefly returned to active duty in 1918 upon the entry of the United States into World War I. Promoted to Captain, he served at Camp Dix, New Jersey, for a six-month period. He retired again in 1919, moving to Billings, Montana, where he lived with his wife, Claudia Browning, who died in 1943 in Billings. In the late 1940s Captain Bivins moved to Philadelphia. He died December 4, 1960, at the age of 94. He is buried at Baltimore National Cemetery.
