= Buffalo Soldier Hill =

Hill in Roosevelt County, New Mexico, USA

Highest point
- Elevation: 1,217 m (3,993 ft)
- Coordinates: 33°46′36″N 103°04′05″W

Geography
- Location: Roosevelt County, New Mexico, United States

Buffalo Soldier Hill is a summit, a hill, in Roosevelt County, New Mexico, in the United States. With an elevation of 3,993 feet (1,217 m), Buffalo Soldier Hill is the 2511st highest summit in New Mexico.

The summit was the scene of the Buffalo Soldier tragedy of 1877, from which it takes its name. Old variant names were Nigger Hill, and Dead Negro Hill. The current name of the hill was approved by the United States Board on Geographic Names around 2005.

Buffalo Soldier Draw in Texas was likely named in memory of the same event.
