= Buffalo Soldier tragedy of 1877 =

U.S. military incident

Buffalo Soldier Tragedy of 1877
- Part of the Buffalo Hunters' War
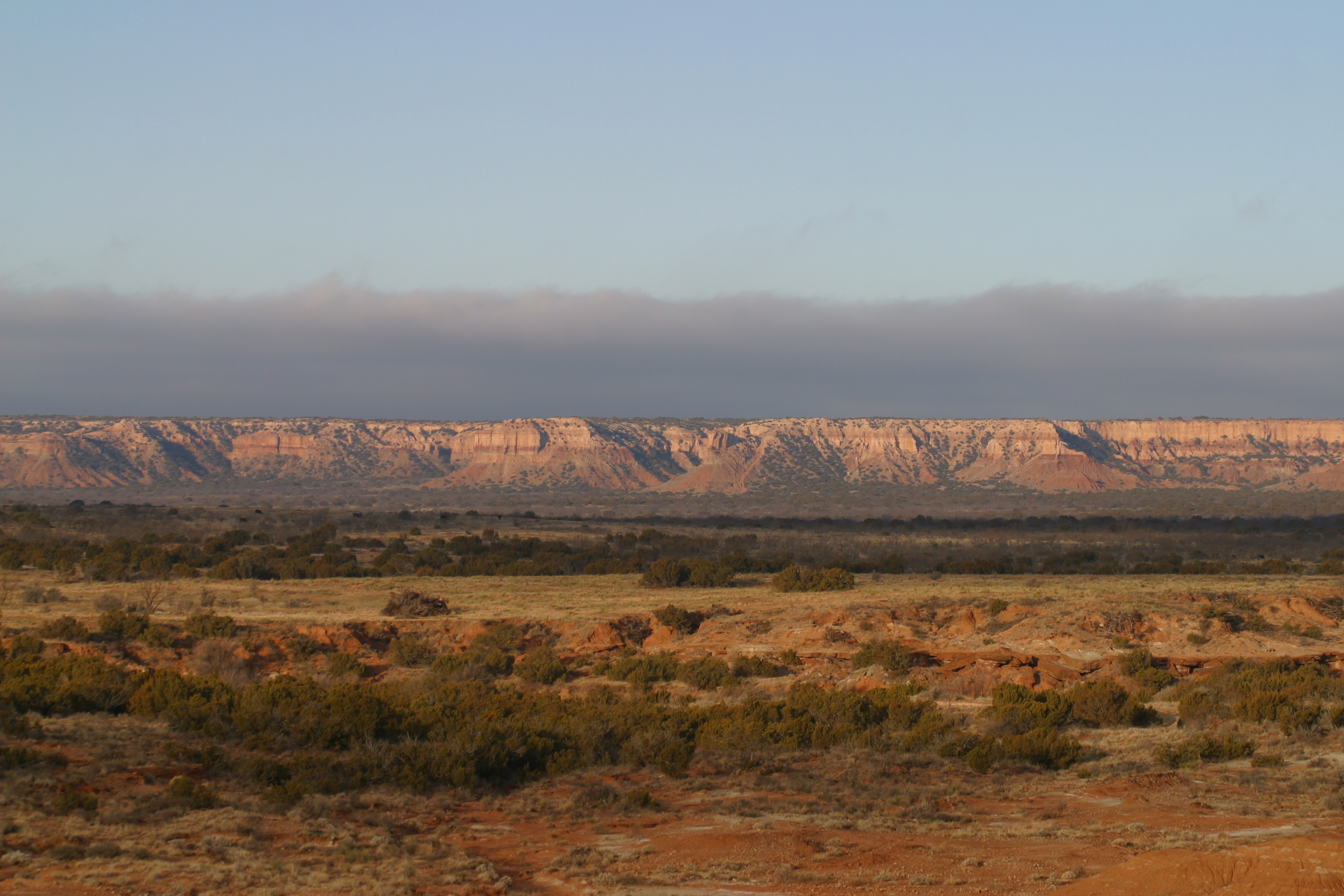
- Caprock Escarpment north of Muchaque Peak
Date	1877
Location	Llano Estacado of North America 33.296145°N 102.225949°W

Belligerents
United States	Comanche

Commanders and leaders
Nicolas Merritt Nolan	

Units involved
10th Cavalry	

Casualties and losses
4 buffalo soldiers and 1 buffalo hunter dead	
- Location within Texas

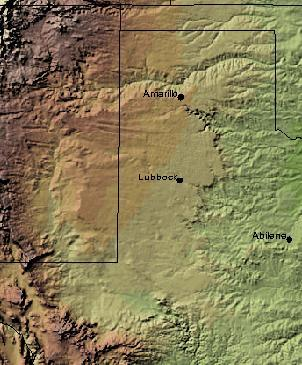
Shaded relief image of the Llano Estacado, the escarpments marking the Llano's northern, eastern, and southern edges clearly visible

The Buffalo Soldier Tragedy of 1877, also known as the Staked Plains Horror, occurred when a combined force of the all-Black Buffalo Soldier troops of the United States Army's 10th Cavalry and local buffalo hunters wandered five days in the Llano Estacado (sometimes translated as Staked Plains) region of northwest Texas and eastern New Mexico during July of a drought year, where four buffalo soldiers and one buffalo hunter died.

News of the ongoing event and speculation about it reached East Coast newspapers via telegraphy, where it was erroneously reported that the expedition had been massacred. Later, after the remainder of the group returned from the Llano, the same newspapers declared them "back from the dead."

== Buffalo Hunters' War ==
A large band of Comanche Indian warriors and their families, about 170 in number, left their reservation in Indian Territory in December 1876 for the Llano Estacado of Texas. In February 1877, they attacked a group of buffalo hunters and stole their stock, wounding several hunters, one fatally. On March 18, the hunters struck back and then retreated, while the Comanche did the same but continued sporadic raiding over the next several months. This event was called the Buffalo Hunters' War or Staked Plains War.

== Background ==
In May 1877, a group of buffalo hunters led by James Harvey, a Civil War veteran and long-time buffalo hunter, was looking for a buffalo herd. After a series of Comanche raids led by Red Young Man, in which much stock was taken and a few hunters killed, the hunters started looking on the Llano Estacado region of northwest Texas and eastern New Mexico for revenge against the Comanche, who had gone far beyond their legal hunting grounds. The buffalo hunters were a mix of former Union and Confederate soldiers, former trappers, and others.

Captain Nicolas Merritt Nolan, an Irish native, was one of the 10th Cavalry's favorite officers, described as "very fine and soldier-like." Nolan had joined the American Army in 1852 as a 17-year-old, rising through the enlisted ranks when he found a niche riding horses. During the Civil War, he fought well, received honors, and became an officer. After the war, he volunteered for duty with the buffalo Soldiers of the 10th Cavalry and commanded Company A (later Troop A) for almost a decade and a half.

Nolan had left Fort Concho on July 10, 1877, with a force of 63 officers and men for a scout (reconnaissance) on the Llano Estacado, looking for Mescalero Apache and Comanche who were out raiding. His route took him past the Llano's eastern rugged caprock northwest toward Bull Creek, following a route he had earlier taken northwest in 1875. During that scout, he followed an Indian trail into the Llano until it grew cold, then turned back. He was threatened with court-martial for not being aggressive enough on that scout, an event that deeply shamed him, and his subsequent patrolling was considered aggressive.

Another event that may have been a factor was the death of Nolan's first wife on February 13, 1877, the eve of Valentine's Day. This event staggered him, and he was described as "bewildered and forlorn." His daughter Kate attended the Ursuline Academy in San Antonio, and his seven-year-old son Ned was cared for by a servant. Nolan "bore his cross ... awkwardly" but tried to cope with the loss.

Nolan took command of Fort Concho on July 6. Grierson had to go east to attend urgent family duties. Almost immediately, orders came for the command to go after the Indian raiders. Because Nolan had already sent out Troop C, he went out with Troop A, leaving only one officer and 16 men at Fort Concho. While en route northeastward, he encountered a former scout who reported over 100 Comanche on the Llano near the head of the North Concho River with a large herd of horses and other stock.

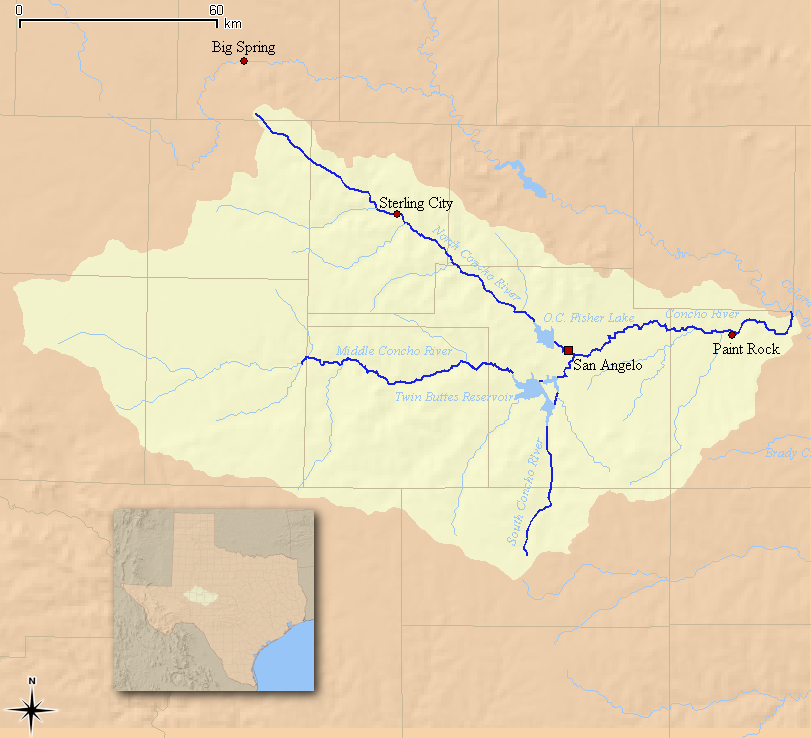
Map of the Concho River and its tributaries

About noon on July 17, Nolan met the buffalo hunters led by Harvey. One of the key players was the hunters' main guide, Jose Piedad Tafoya, a former Comanchero—traders with the Comanche. Tafoya knew the Llano well, but was weak in English. With the help of other hunters, he spoke with Nolan at Bull Creek, which was 7 mi (11 km) east of Muchaque Peak in Borden County. After Nolan showed the hunters his orders, they were willing to combine forces despite initial mistrust.

The hunters had previously been in an armed conflict with the Comanche and were seeking to recover their stock as well as seek revenge. It was decided that they would provide guidance and firepower and that Nolan's soldiers would engage in combat and offer medical aid and supplies. Nolan's personal aim was to redeem himself and demonstrate his worthiness of a command that would restore his good reputation. The goal of both groups was to find water every 24 hours. In compliance with his orders, Nolan set up a supply base at Bull Creek, across from the buffalo hunter supply base.

The events that unfolded over the next two weeks led to a series of command-and-control errors, compounded by civilian distrust. Alongside recruits, the oppressive heat, wool uniforms, and alcohol supplied by the hunters to the soldiers created a perilous mix that tested Nolan and his men. He had planned a 20-day scout from his Bull Creek supply base, utilizing mules from the wagons as pack animals and dispatching the empty wagons back to Fort Concho for additional supplies to be ready upon his return at the supply base.

On the evening of July 18, some of the hunters' supplies, including alcohol, were shared with some of the soldiers for a small price. Some of the sergeants not staying in the supply camp apparently partook. Later the next day, when 40 of the 60 men of Company A set out for Cedar Lake, the sergeants failed to check that every soldier had filled his canteen with water, with the result that in the heat of the day those who had been drinking the evening before were terribly parched and did not ration their water. Their example led many of the recruits to drain their canteens. The hunters carried more water than the soldiers, aware that the heat and weather would make finding water harder. They were also conditioned to the heat and maintained strict water discipline.

When the combined commands of Nolan and Harvey made a dry camp on the evening of July 19, Nolan discovered that his men lacked water. The hunters were amused at this, perhaps thinking it was a good lesson for the soldiers. The next day led them up Sulfur Draw (referred to as Tobacco Creek by Nolan) and made the difficult climb up the caprock onto the "Yarner" of the Llano. They headed for a large playa—a shallow depression that fills only when it rains—that the hunters reported nearby, reaching it on July 21. Lieutenant Charles Cooper estimated this basin at about 5 acres (20,000 m^{2}) in size, with a maximum depth of 33 in (840 mm). There, they all delighted in the water and played. Cooper described the rare event of men of different cultures and races, horses, mules, birds, and other animals enjoying the water as one of the greatest "aggregations of the animal kingdom ever witnessed" "outside a circus tent" in one small place.

== Divergent goals ==
On the afternoon of July 18, at about 16:00 in the 100 °F(38°C)-plus heat, Quanah Parker, a Kwahada leader, rode into camp from the north with two older Comanche couples. They were equipped with Army horses, rifles, supplies, and a large official envelope that contained a pass to leave the reservation for 40 days. It was dated July 12, and signed by the Indian agent J. M. Haworth at Fort Sill, Oklahoma, and more importantly, by Colonel Ranald S. Mackenzie of the 4th Cavalry. The pass authorized Parker and the Comanche couples to seek out, find, and bring back the large band of Comanche under Red Young Man. It also warned against anyone harming them on their mission.

Nolan accepted the pass as genuine, but his writings show his frustration at Parker competing for his own mission. Cooper wrote that Nolan swore and unleashed a long series of invective-filled frustrations at everyone who seemed to be against "his" mission. It took him a while to calm down. He then asked Parker questions on the whereabouts of the Comanche raiders and their destination. Parker glanced in one direction and gestured in another while Tafoya translated. Despite being proficient in English, Parker never spoke it with Nolan.

In a three-way conversation, Tafoya served as the intermediary between Parker and Nolan, providing translations. The goals of all parties differed. Tafoya and Parker prioritized their own objectives, and despite a history of animosity between them, Tafoya seemingly agreed to deceive the soldiers in exchange for the return of his livestock with added interest. He intentionally mistranslated parts of the conversation to mislead Nolan. Through the three-way dialogue and translations, Nolan swiftly discerned that a deal had been struck between Parker and the interpreter/guide Tafoya. Subsequently, Nolan began to lose critical trust in his primary trail guide. Later, his confidence in the hunters wavered, and perhaps these witnesses to Nolan's outburst also began to question their faith in their commander.

After Parker departed southward, he remained faithful to his mission and successfully persuaded the Comanche raiders to return to the reservation. Tafoya upheld his commitment and led the soldiers off the main trail, diverting them from a false path laid by the Comanche raiders. Subsequently, Tafoya recovered his missing livestock and those of many others. He was later hailed as "the honest, loyal, and gallant company guide" until the truth was eventually revealed.

After a night march, Nolan, his troopers, and the buffalo hunters arrived at Cedar Lake around 08:00 on the morning of July 22 and found the once-expansive 4-by-6 mi (6-by-10km) lake in 1875 had dried up. Using cups, however, the men dug deep holes throughout the day to slowly obtain water. The following day, Tafoya, Harvey, and Johnny Cook embarked on a scouting mission to the south and west of Cedar Lake. During their absence, Parker visited and stayed for approximately six hours. Upon the return of Tafoya, Harvey, and Cook, they reported fresh signs of Indians moving towards Double Lakes. By noon on July 25, they reached Double Lakes only to find them dry, prompting the men to dig for water.

Nolan grew increasingly frustrated as he sensed something amiss. Many of the hunters became impatient, convinced that the Comanche raiders were hiding in the sand hills, and so they dispatched a scout in that direction without the soldiers. Several other hunters abandoned the mission. Concerns about the arid conditions led them to believe that this was the underlying issue. They pointed out to the soldiers that most of the bison and pronghorn had departed the area, indicating a severe drought. As one hunter remarked, "If the rest had good sense, they wouldn't (go further) either."

First Sergeant William L. Umbles was demoted on that day, although the exact reasons remain uncertain. Some speculated that Nolan was displeased with him, suggesting that Umbles may have attempted to persuade him to turn back, potentially eroding Nolan's trust in the first sergeant following a prior alcohol incident. Although both men remained silent about the precise cause, many observed Umbles' frustration, evident in his behavior during the ensuing period of challenge. The hunters returned to camp, excited after discovering a significant trail of signs, with Tafoya estimating that a group of 40 Comanche was near Rich Lake. Boots and saddles were swiftly called for, and the men hastened to depart.

Despite the urgency, Nolan had not immediately appointed another acting first sergeant and, in his eagerness to set out, overlooked ensuring that all canteens were filled. Although that task was typically the first sergeant's responsibility, it ultimately fell on the commander to ensure that such essential tasks were completed.

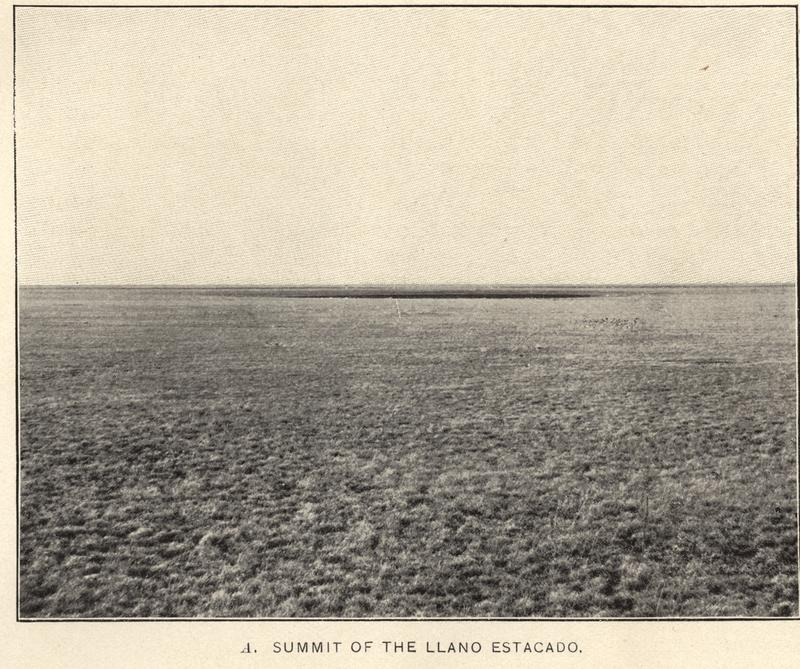
Level surface of the Llano Estacado with natural grass cover as seen in 1900

== The "thirsting time" ==
=== Day one ===
On the afternoon of July 26, between 14:00 and 15:00, Captain Nolan led his soldiers, along with Jim Harvey's hunters, westward from Double Lakes towards the trail of 40 Comanche Indians near Rich Lake, 7 miles away. Upon reaching the lake, they found no water, and the Indian sign reported by Tafoya was not corroborated by the other scouts, indicating that the trail was likely made by only eight horses. While Tafoya's initial plan had seemed promising, most of the soldiers were now without water; and despite efforts to dig in the dry soil, no water source was found. The hunters shared their water sparingly.

Tafoya then suggested that water could be found 15 or 20 miles northwest, following the Indian trail, so Nolan decided they would pursue the trail the next morning.

=== Day two ===
Just after sunrise the next day, July 27, the men continued to follow the trail. As they covered more miles, the reddish soil transitioned to a "more sandy" terrain, requiring greater effort to advance. By 09:00, the Indians they were tracking veered westward, leading deeper into arid surroundings. Between 14:00 and 15:00, after approximately 25 miles of challenging travel, the Indians dispersed in eight directions, leaving criss-crossing trails. The hunters' horses were fatigued; the older army horses fared even worse. Men began to feel lethargic in the oppressive heat.

Johnny Cook, one of the hunters, noted that the Indians seemed to be deliberately leading them on a dry path, intending to exhaust them with thirst. Recognizing the urgent need for water, Nolan had scouts search for potential water sources for both the animals and the men. Tafoya and other scouts identified the point where the Indian trails converged once more, prompting Nolan to pursue them. The men endured the relentless heat, with one soldier succumbing to sunstroke and requiring immediate attention. Nolan sent a trooper ahead to instruct the scouts to wait for their arrival.

Tafoya said that the Comanche they were following were headed for Lost Lake (now near Dora, New Mexico) to the northwest, expressing assurance that the hunters and soldiers would intercept them there and find water. The hunters and Nolan agreed to this plan, although conflicting accounts emerged later. Cook described Nolan as emotional and dramatic, and the hunters sympathized and agreed to continue. In contrast, Nolan wrote that he believed water could be found six or seven miles ahead, as per Tafoya's report, and he entrusted him with the best horse to locate the water source. Following at the pace of the slowest member in his command, Nolan observed Tafoya's movements.

Unaware of Tafoya's mission, Lieutenant Cooper believed Tafoya was lost as well as the expedition and so under the "broiling sun" and through the "barren sandy plain" the men marched. Some fell, upon which Nolan assigned the strongest to help the weakest. The plan, though noble, was impractical, and the 64 men were soon stretched over 2 mi (3.2 km) of the trail. Near dark and some 9 mi (14 km) of arduous going, Nolan stopped the march.

Nolan now decided on a different plan made by Jim Harvey earlier. Eight men were to move forward following Tafoya's trail to Silver Lake and return with water. Unknown to Nolan, however, he would not see these men until August 9, and he would never see Tafoya or his horse again. After dark, Nolan pressed the men another 9 mi (14 km) before stopping for the night near a mound then called "Nigger Hill," located in New Mexico, about a mile west of the Texas border. He could hear men down the trail and, thinking they were lost, fired shots into the air to help them find camp. Some straggled into camp.

As Sergeant Umbles, the former first sergeant, was still out in the dark with two sick men, Nolan had the bugler—also named Nolan—take a horse, find the men, and return them to camp. Those four men never returned, however, and on his return Nolan charged them with desertion. Umbles and the others later declared that Nolan had men looking for water, and that was what they were doing. Later, they joined with a hunter who had chased his runaway horses. They headed for Silver Lake and water.

The main group of men, after some 55 miles of trail, were unable to eat because of the dryness of their mouths. The hunters settled separately from the soldiers and in the dark, bemoaned their fate with them. As the cloudless night allowed the heat to dissipate, some of the mules, smelling the breeze, took off. The hunters shouted at the soldiers to get their mules, but no one stirred in their exhaustion, and the hunters settled down.

=== Day three ===
Just after midnight the following day, July 28, the firing of shots woke the men. They did a head count and found one of the hunters missing. Unknown to them, he had joined the four soldiers headed for water. After the alert, the men had a hard time settling down. At daybreak, Nolan concluded that Tafoya was lost, as were the hunters. He may have discussed this with Cooper, but that is not documented. Because of the men's exhaustion, Nolan himself repacked the remaining mules, deciding what was needed and what could be left. They covered some 15 mi (24 km) before he called a halt.

Nolan figured they had missed Silver Lake and so had no choice but to set a compass course back to Double Lakes. No sign was found of the men sent out for water, however. He figured his position to be some 55 mi (89 km) northwest of Double Lakes, where he knew for a fact that water could be found.

At this point, the Comanche were forgotten and the primary struggle was for survival. But the hunters disagreed, and the expedition began to break up. As the hunters described it, they began to grumble and think it was going to be every man for himself. Although Nolan argued the best course was to stay together, the hunters strode off, then went separate ways focusing on their own survival goals. Two men fell behind and were lost to Nolan. Through the pounding heat and endless march, men began to fall and Nolan continued to assign the strongest to the weakest.

The desire for water stood above all else as Nolan headed southeast toward where he knew water was. Troopers now collected their own urine and that of their horses to drink. Nolan issued sugar for the combination. Whereas urine is generally sterile, it has a high concentration of electrolytes, which only exacerbates dehydration and thirst. Just before sunset, Nolan called a halt, believing his men were "completely exhausted." Cooper later wrote that "their tongues and throats were swollen, and they were unable to even swallow their saliva – in fact they had no saliva to swallow." Even sugar poured into their mouths failed to dissolve.

Unknown to Nolan, the men he had sent off to find water found some. Several filled their canteens and searched for the command. They first found the hunters and gave them water, but without finding Nolan, they returned to the waterhole, unaware that he was heading back to Double Lakes. That night, clouds covered the sky raising hopes for a sign of rain but there were few.

Umbles left a note at Silver Lake instructing any soldiers who came across it to head east, which the soldiers returning from searching for the command later did. That evening. Harvey asked Umbles to let the hunters use the horses, but Umbles refused. The hunters interpreted that decision as a refusal "to go back to the relief of his officers and comrades." Eventually, 12 soldiers gathered there and headed for safety, with two more being found on the way.

=== Day four ===
At 02:00 on July 29, to take advantage of the cool of the night, Nolan resumed his track southeast by compass. He had wanted to start earlier, but a horse went down and couldn't move. The men cut its throat and drank its blood. Nolan again repacked what he thought was most important, abandoning the rest. They rode, then walked the horses and repeated the process over and over. As the day progressed, the walks grew longer due to the animals' condition. The clouds helped, but no rain fell. They lost another horse and watched rain appear to fall from whence they had come. After some 25 mi (40 km), they rested from their intense labor through the heat. In their dehydrated exhaustion, several animals walked away without anyone's notice.

Due to the lack of water and the heat, the men were now becoming slightly crazed. They were thirsty but could not drink, and starving but could not eat what they had. Vertigo with dimness of vision began to set in. The men appeared deaf and stuporous, as their bodies began to shut down. Men began to fight over the thick blood cut from the remaining horses. Nolan and Cooper struggled to keep their remaining men alive and were as harsh as necessary to do so.

Buffalo hunter Bill Benson also walked away from the command and finally found water at about 15:00 pm the next day at Punta del Agua (present-day Lubbock Lake), after some 96 hours without water. Later that day, Nolan and Cooper concluded that their only hope was to send the strongest men with the remaining horses ahead to Double Lakes, and that they would remain with the men for better or worse. Nolan ordered now-First Sergeant Jim Thompson to ride ahead with six men to obtain water. Thompson did so, but got lost and in the process five of the seven horses died. In the evening, the remaining supplies were abandoned.

=== Day five ===
July 30, just after 03:00, the men stumbled over an old wagon trail. After going a way along the easier trail, Cooper declared to Nolan that this was Col. William R. Shafter's 1875 wagon trail, a route between Double Lakes and Punta del Agua. The men rejoiced with shouts and fired their weapons in celebration. Between 05:00 and 06:00, the half-dead soldiers staggered into Double Lakes to the water holes they had dug a week before. The men who had been sent out for water came in last; they had gone over the trail without notice and turned around when they heard the other men on the trail firing. These 14 men had gone for over 86 hours without water in the High Plains heat and amazingly had survived.

After a rest, Nolan sent out men with water to look for stragglers. On finding some wandering horses that had been with the hunters, they made a diligent search for survivors and recovered what supplies they could. Nolan was still missing men and feared many were dead. The men began to recover from their ordeal.

On the morning of July 31, Captain Phillip Lee, having heard two days earlier that Nolan had been at Double Lakes, arrived there from Fort Griffin with Troop G. For many of the men, it was a reunion. Nolan's men told him of their ordeal. With Lee's assistance, patrols were sent out looking for Nolan's missing men, but nothing was found other than one man and several horses.

Most of the hunters proceeded to the site of present-day Lubbock, where they found much of their stolen stock and learned that the Comanche were returning to their reservation with Parker. Tafoya had already claimed his stock, as had several others. The hunters later declared this the last Comanche raid in Texas. The first of the hunters to arrive would send out word about Nolan's lost command with the speculation that the Comanche had wiped them out. The story was sent east by telegraph, where it made headline news.

Quanah Parker, true to his word, had convinced the tired Comanche to go back to the reservation. In the early part of August, they returned to Fort Sill after dropping off their stolen stock. Later, it was reported that Parker and Tafoya had misled the soldiers and hunters away from the Comanche raiders. Nolan later was shocked to learn that Parker spoke English fairly well.

Sergeant Umbles first headed toward Double Lakes but changed course and reached the supply camp at Bull Creek, headed by First Sergeant Thomas H. Allsup, on August 1 with 14 men. Although many of the men with Umbles wanted to go to Double Lakes to search for their officers and companions, he ordered them not to; and so, despite strong objections, they followed his commands. On their arrival at Bull Creek, Umbles stated that he was now in command of the supply camp although he knew that Nolan had demoted him. He suggested that Nolan and the other men were dead, but Allsup refused to believe it, wanting to head to Double Lakes with supplies. Loading a wagon with barrels of water and other supplies, he went straight there with 15 men and on August 4 had a happy reunion with Nolan and his men. Allsup reported Umbles' arrival at Bull Creek and what he had said, and several other soldiers who had been with Umbles also told what had happened over the last few days.

Nolan and Cooper now began to realize that their problems were not over because men had deserted and would have to be dealt with. Nolan wrote a message that he sent on toward Fort Concho with two riders, giving a report of the general condition of his command and a warning to distrust anything Umbles and the men with him had to say.

== Return ==
In the evening of August 3, Umbles and a few others made it back to Fort Concho, reporting to the sole officer, Lieutenant Robert G. Smithers, that Nolan's command was lost and dead or dying on the Llano, with the implication they might have been wiped out. This report caused gloom and doom to spread around the camp, with some men expecting that the fort would be attacked next. The chaplain went to Cooper's wife to break the news that her husband was missing, then to comfort Nolan's children.

Smithers then began to send telegrams up the chain of command to other forts, requesting assistance to guard Fort Concho while he sent out a relief column. He gathered men from the band and hospital, and sent 16 effectives and a wagon of supplies for the relief of the lost command. They made the trip of 140 mi (230 km) to Bull Creek in 41 hours, returning with Nolan and his command between 08:00 and 09:00 on the morning of August 14. On August 7, couriers reached Fort Concho with the good news. The telegraph sent out word that Nolan was returning with his command, and word went east that Nolan and his lost command were "back from the dead." The officer in charge of the relief force guarding the fort had Umbles and his three companions placed under guard.

For all the men involved, it had been a test of character, which some failed. The cost was high, with four soldiers and one hunter dead, along with 30 horses and six mules, and the rest rendered virtually useless. Nolan's fears for his lost men eventually turned to anger as they slowly returned to Fort Concho and the stories were told. Nolan, as commander of the fort, became very busy ordering new horses and supplies and preparing for a court-martial for the four deserters led by former First Sergeant Umbles. These men were later found guilty, were dishonorably discharged, and spent time at Fort Leavenworth Military Prison in Kansas.

Nolan wrote his formal report regarding the loss of military equipment and the deaths and suffering of his men. Many of the events described by Nolan were later mentioned in the letters Lieutenant Cooper wrote home. Still, the documentation left to historians by the hunters, the soldiers, and the court-martialed Nolan and Cooper's material led to divergence and more questions. While Nolan's mission was a failure, the press was positive, and he was commended by his superiors in the press, but not officially for the record.

Nolan remained in command of A Troop for another five years. He and his second-in-command, Cooper, lost their ability to work together over a long series of minor incidents and in late 1879, Nolan placed Cooper on report "for failure to forward personal reports." However, Cooper went on serving in the military and retired just after the turn of the century as a lieutenant colonel.

On December 19, 1882, Nolan was promoted to major in the Regular Army and transferred to the 3rd U.S. Cavalry Regiment. On October 24, 1883, he died unexpectedly in Holbrook, Arizona, from a stroke. His body was shipped to the San Antonio National Cemetery in San Antonio, Texas, where he lies in rest in section A, site 53, near the flagpole that flies the flag of his adopted country.

== 1978 reenactment ==
In 1978, eight Black Americans in cavalry uniforms mounted a horse patrol to retrace the route of Nolan and the Buffalo Soldiers of Troop A, led by Eric Strong of the Lubbock-based Roots Historical Committee. They made every effort to camp where the soldiers had stopped 101 years prior. Author Elmer Kelton traveled with this group for a short time, gathering material for a Western fiction book he was writing. Published in 1980 under the title The Wolf and the Buffalo, the book has two chapters that portray the real-life "Buffalo Soldier Tragedy of 1877."

== Historical marker ==
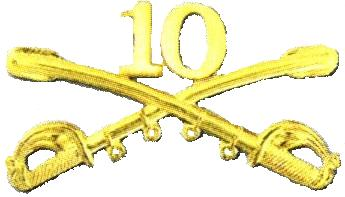
10th Regiment United States Cavalry insignia

Remembering the dead soldiers of Troop A, 10th U.S. Cavalry, Captain Nicholas M. Nolan commanding.

- Trooper John H. Bonds, 24, a day laborer from Virginia, enlisted in the Army in Washington, DC, in early 1877.
- Trooper John T. Gordon, 28, joined the Army in Baltimore, Maryland, in December 1876.
- Trooper John Isaacs, 25, a waiter from Baltimore, joined the Army in January 1877.
- Trooper Isaac Derwin, 25, a laborer from South Carolina, joined the Army in Tennessee in November 1876.

The Nolan Expedition Route received a historic marker in 1972.

On July 1, 2008, Texas placed a new historical marker to honor the men of the "Buffalo Soldier Tragedy of 1877." Markers were placed for the four fallen soldiers of Company A, 10th Cavalry at Morton Memorial Cemetery, but the cemetery is not their burial site. The Cochran County Historical Commission had applied for markers and headstones for the fallen, and money was collected from the community, without mention of the death of the fallen white buffalo hunter. Four additional cenotaph memorials to the four buffalo soldiers are in the San Antonio National Cemetery.

== See also ==
- The Army and Navy Journal dated September 15, 1877, has an article called, "A Fearful march on the Staked Plains" taken from a report of Nicholas M. Nolan, cited in Peter Cozzens' volume 3 of his Eyewitnesses to the Indian Wars, 1865-1890 series, with a related report on the subject following.
- Buffalo Soldiers.
