= Buffalo Soldier Draw =

Valley in Texas, US

Coordinates: 33.083333°N 101.550000°W

Buffalo Soldier Draw (formerly Dead Nigger Draw and Dead Negro Draw) is a valley in Garza and Lynn counties, Texas, United States. When wet, the valley contains a stream which runs 3 miles (4.8 km) until it reaches the Double Mountain Fork Brazos River.

== Name ==
It was called "Dead Nigger Draw" until 1963, when the then United States Secretary of the Interior Stewart Udall mandated that the word "Nigger" in geographic names on federal maps and other products be changed to "Negro". Both names probably commemorate the Buffalo Soldier tragedy of 1877. On April 9, 2020, the United States Board on Geographic Names approved Garza County Judge Lee Norman's request to rename Dead Negro Draw to Buffalo Soldier Draw.

== See also ==
- Grandstaff Canyon
- List of rivers of Texas
- Place names considered unusual
