= 10th Cavalry Regiment (United States) =

- 10th Cavalry coat of arms
- Active: 1866–1944, 1958–2026
- Country: United States
- Branch: United States Army
- Type: Cavalry
- Size: Regiment
- Nickname: "Buffalo Soldiers"
- Mottos: Ready and Forward
- Engagements: Indian Wars; Spanish–American War; Philippine–American War; Mexican Expedition; World War I era combat on US-Mexican border; World War II; Vietnam War; Iraq War; War in Afghanistan
- Decorations: Presidential Unit Citation (2); Valorous Unit Award (1st Squadron); Valorous Unit Award (1st BCT); Valorous Unit Award (2nd BRT); Republic of Vietnam Cross of Gallantry with Palm (2); Republic of Vietnam Civil Action Honor Medal, First Class; Army Superior Unit Award (selected units)

Commanders
- Notable commanders: Benjamin H. Grierson; Guy V. Henry; Samuel Whitside; George Grunert; John J Pershing

Insignia
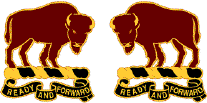
- Regimental distinctive insignia

General of the Armies of the United States John Pershing reviews the Machine Gun Troop of the 10th Cavalry Regiment upon its posting to Fort Myer in 1931. The 10th were some of the first black troops to serve at Fort Myer, Va.

The 10th Cavalry Regiment is a unit of the United States Army. Formed as a segregated African-American unit, the 10th Cavalry was one of the original "Buffalo Soldier" regiments in the post–Civil War Regular Army. It served in combat during the Indian Wars in the western United States, the Spanish–American War in Cuba, Philippine–American War and Mexican Revolution. The regiment was trained as a combat unit but later relegated to non-combat duty and served in that capacity in World War II until its deactivation in 1944.

The 10th Cavalry was reactivated as an integrated combat unit in 1958. Portions of the regiment have served in conflicts ranging from the Vietnam War to Operation Enduring Freedom and Operation Iraqi Freedom. The current structure is one squadron, the 4th Squadron 10th Cavalry Regiment unit, and one separate Armored Cavalry Troop, C Troop 10th Cavalry, in active service. 4-10 CAV is assigned to the 3rd Armored Brigade Combat Team of the U.S. 4th Infantry Division at Ft Carson, Colorado. C Troop, 10 CAV is assigned as the Armored Cavalry Troop to 1st Armored Brigade Combat Team of the U.S. 1st Cavalry Division at Fort Hood, Texas.

== Buffalo Soldier name ==
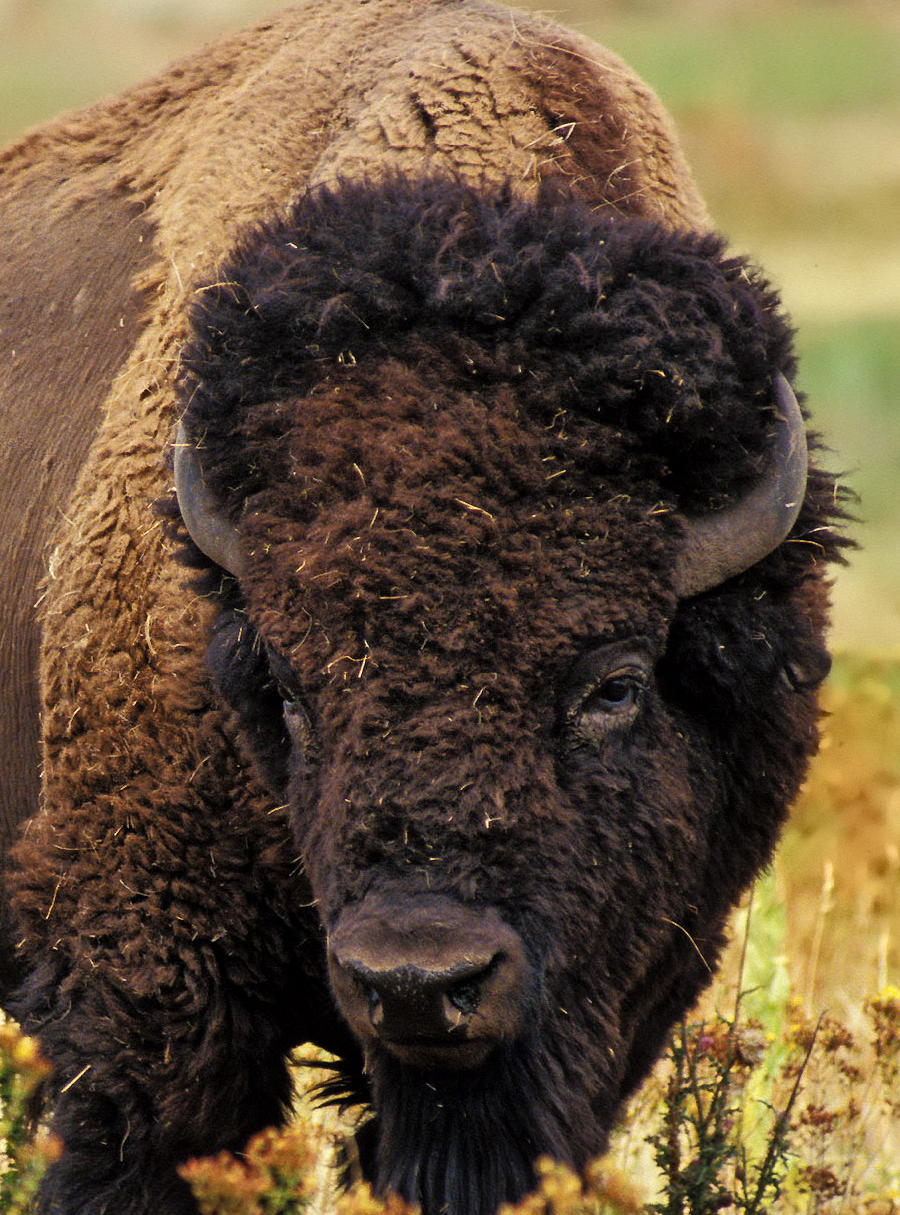
Head of the American buffalo

From the late 1860s on the Plain Indians called the black troopers of the US Army Buffalo Soldiers. The Indians gave them the appellation because of the similarity of the soldiers' tightly textured short hair to the fur of the buffalo.

== Insignia ==
=== Coat of arms ===
- Shield: Per pale, dexter: paly of thirteen Argent and Gules, a chief Azure charged with a Native American chief's war bonnet affronté above a tomahawk and stone axe in saltire heads down all Proper, sinister: per fess quarterly Gules and Argent in 1st and 4th a tower Or gated Azure 2d and 3d lion rampant Gules crowned with a ducal cornet Or; on an oval escutcheon Azure a fleur-de-lis Or; and Sable a triangle on its base charged with a sun ombre de soleil Or between three mullets of the like pierced of the field.
- Crest: On a wreath of the colors Or and Sable an American bison statant guardant Proper.
- Motto: "Ready and Forward".

=== Regimental distinctive insignia ===
- Description:
  - A gold color metal and enamel device 1 inch (2.54 cm) blazoned: On an heraldic wreath Or and Sable, a buffalo statant Proper.
  - On a scroll of the second fimbriated of the first the motto "READY AND FORWARD" of the like.
- Symbolism:
  - Black and gold have long been used as the regimental colors.
  - The buffalo has likewise been the emblem of the regiment for many years having its origin in the term "Buffalo soldiers" applied by the Indians to colored regiments.
  - The distinctive unit insignia is worn in pairs.
- Background:
  - The distinctive unit insignia was originally approved on 13 March 1922.
  - It was amended 6 December 1923 to change the wording in the description and the method of wear.
  - On 19 March 1951 the insignia was re-designated for the 510th Tank Battalion.
  - The distinctive unit insignia was re-designated for the 10th Cavalry on 12 May 1959.
  - The current version was re-affirmed on 22 August 1991.

=== Symbolism ===
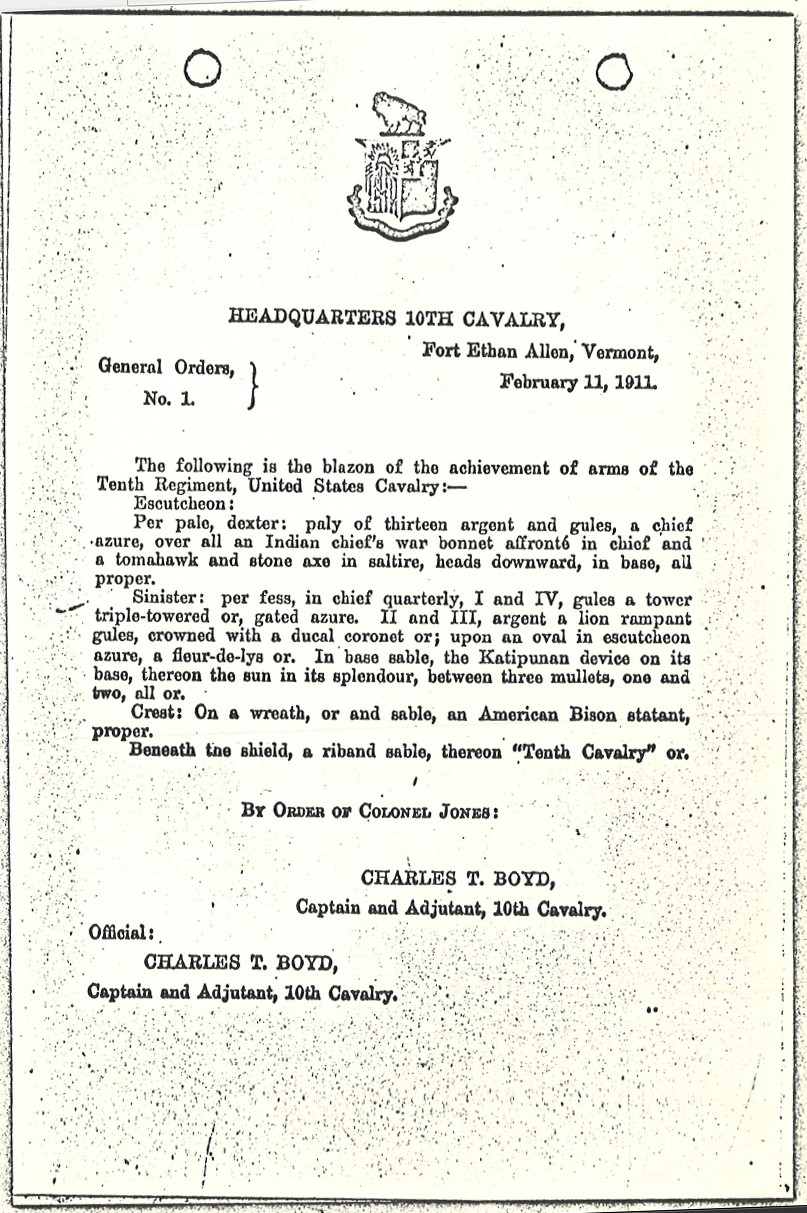
10th Regiment United States Cavalry Coat of Arms description from 1911.

The 10th Cavalry Coat of arms was first confirmed on 11 February 1911 at Fort Ethan Allen in Vermont as "General Orders No. 1" by order of Colonel Thaddeus W. Jones. The 1911 description of the Arms is different from that used today, and has no functional difference except for symbolism. There was no symbolic explanations or reasons given for the basic symbols of the Regimental Arms in 1911 or when the arms were re-affirmed on 22 August 1991. The following is gathered from many heraldic and military sources.

Above the shield is part of the distinctive unit insignia, the "Buffalo" (American Bison). On the arms it faces left, which represents the western movement of the early unit across the United States. The black and gold on which the buffalo stands are "the colour of the negro" and the "refined gold" which the regiment represents.

The left side is for the 43 years of service (1866–1909) in the American West that were formative for the 10th Cavalry. The blue represents the sky and open plains of the west. The ceremonial war bonnet and eagle feathers honors the respect of the Native American tribes. The tomahawk and stone axe with the heads down indicate peace achieved. The vertical red and white stripes are for 13 major campaigns.

Upper right. The Castilian Coat of Arms, without the crown, represents the Spanish–American War and indirectly the Philippine Insurrection where the 10th helped liberate Cuba (1898) and fought in the Philippines (1899–1902).

Lower right. The black background is the African-American ancestry. Within the yellow pyramid (triangle) is a symbol of the sun and 3 stars. Under the original 1911 description of the Arms this is described as "In base sable, the Katipunan device on its base, thereon the sun in its splendour, between three mullets, one and two, all or." This stresses the Katipunan, Philippine revolutionaries, who were engaged in three years of campaigns against the 10th.

An inaccurate and informal interpretation of the lower right section by several veterans and groups of the 10th describe that section as follows; the sun with its rays showing the rebirth of the 10th as cavalry. The sun symbol is different from the 22nd Regimental sun symbol and here represents a renewal. The triangle comes from the Seventh Army pyramid patch which the 510th Tank battalion (Negro), then part of the 19th Armored Group and attached to the 4th Infantry Division and in support to the 22nd Infantry Regiment. Again, the 1911 description and use predates this informal view.

The distinctive unit insignia approved on 13 March 1922 (amended 6 December 1923) denoted its use as a paired set of devices or unit insignia with the head of the buffalo (the American bison) facing the head and neck of the individual in uniform. This is to remind the wearer that the unit totem, the "Buffalo" is forever watching them.

== Regimental Song ==
The Buffaloes

(The Regimental Song of the Tenth Cavalry Regiment from about 1885. Sung to the tune of Stephen Foster's "Camptown Races")

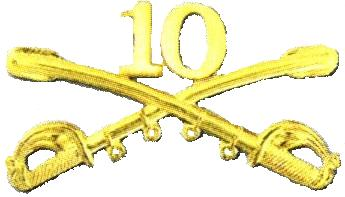
10th Regiment United States Cavalry insignia.

We're fighting bulls of the Buffaloes,
Git a goin' – git a goin'
From Kansas' plains we'll hunt our foes;
A trottin' down the line.
Our range spreads west to Santa Fe,
Git a goin' – git a goin'.
From Dakota down the Mexican way;
A trottin' down the line.

Goin' to drill all day
Goin' to drill all night,
We got our money on the buffaloes,
Somebody bet on the fight.

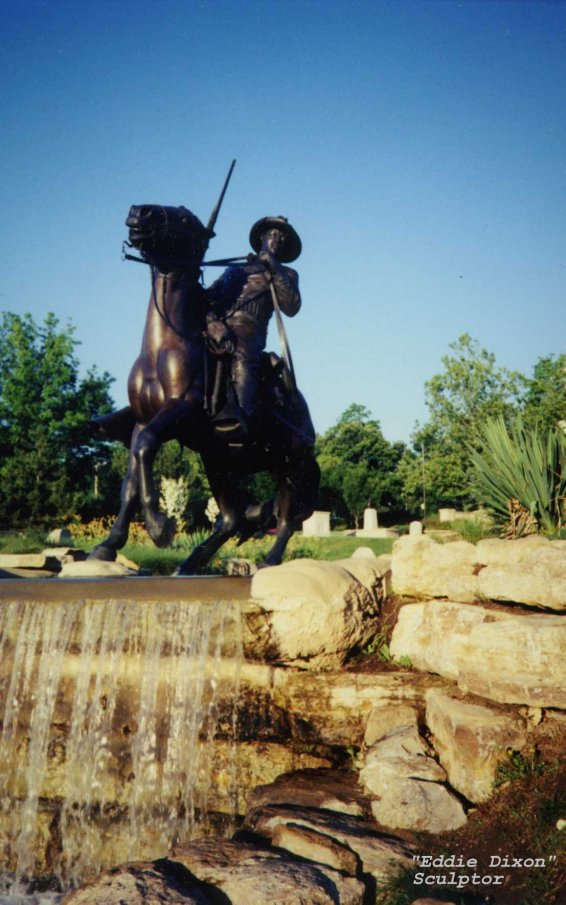
The Buffalo Soldier Monument at Fort Leavenworth, Kansas. It honors the African-American Buffalo soldiers and those who led them.

Pack up your saddle and make it light.
Git a rollin' – git a rollin'.
You are training fast for a hard fight;
A rollin' down the line.
Untie your horse and boot and gun,
Git a goin' – git a goin'.
Shake out your feet or you'll miss the fun,
A rollin' down the line.

Goin' to drill all day
Goin' to drill all night,
We got our money on the buffaloes,
Somebody bet on the fight.

It's Troops in line for the Buffaloes,
Git a movin' – git a movin'.
Then Squadron mass when the bugle blows'
A movin' into line.
Pull in your reins and sit your horse,
Git a movin' – git a movin'.
If you can't ride you'll be a corpse;
A movin' into line.

Goin' to drill all day
Goin' to drill all night,
We got our money on the buffaloes,
Somebody bet on the fight.

== Early history ==
=== Indian Wars 1866–74 ===
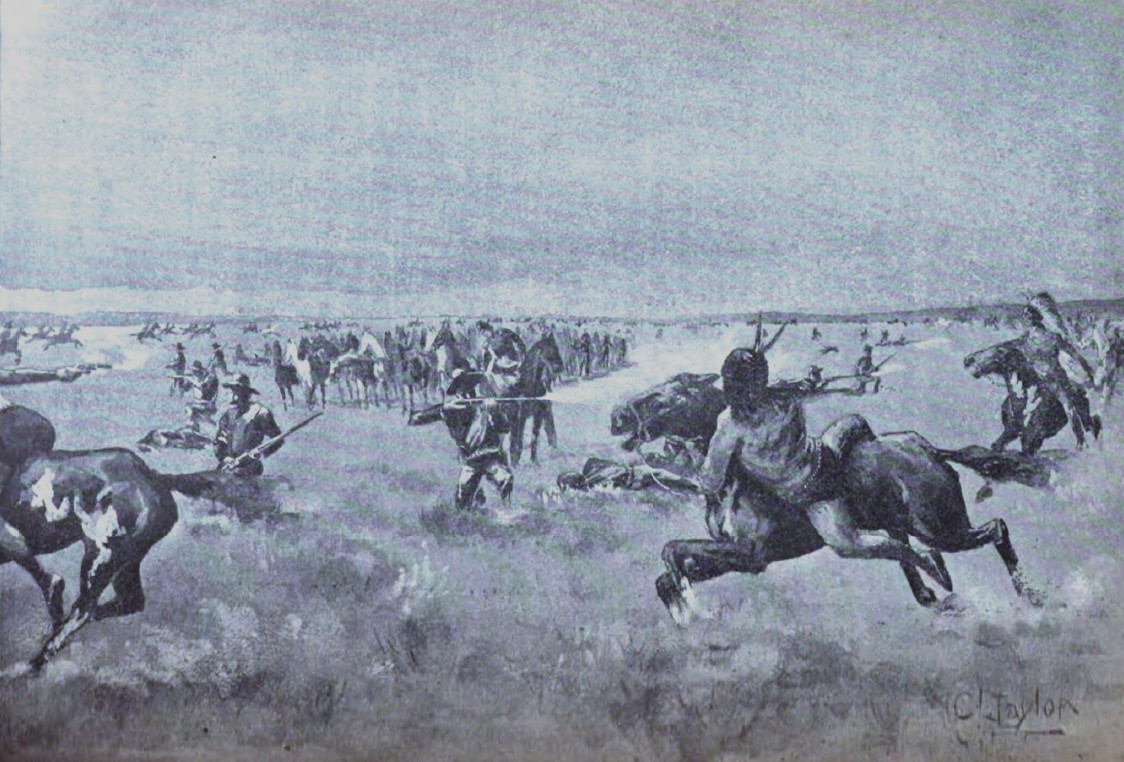
"Wounded and lifted on Horse"- A painting by C. Taylor from the book "Ups and Downs of an Army Officer" written by George A. Armes. The painting describes when the then Captain Armes was wounded in the hip and lifted up on a horse during the Battle of the Saline River in August 1867.

The 10th U.S. Cavalry was formed at Fort Leavenworth, Kansas, in 1866 as an all-African-American regiment. The 10th U.S. Cavalry regiment was composed of black enlisted men and white officers, which was typical for that era. By the end of July 1867, eight companies of enlisted men had been recruited from the Departments of Missouri, Arkansas, and the Platte. Life at Leavenworth was not pleasant for the 10th Cavalry. The fort's commander, who was openly opposed to African-Americans serving in the Regular Army, made life for the new troops difficult. Colonel Benjamin Grierson sought to have his regiment transferred, and subsequently received orders moving the regiment to Fort Riley, Kansas. This began on the morning of 6 August 1867 and was completed the next day in the afternoon of 7 August.

One of the first battles of the 10th was the Battle of the Saline River. This battle occurred 25 miles northwest of Fort Hays in Kansas near the end of August 1867. After a railroad work party was wiped out, patrols from the 38th Infantry Regiment (in 1869 reorganized into the 24th Infantry Regiment) with a 10th Cavalry troop were sent out to locate the "hostile" Cheyenne forces.

Captain George Armes, Company F, 10th Cavalry, while following an active trail along the Saline River were surrounded by about 400 Cheyenne warriors. Armes formed a defensive "hollow square" with the cavalry mounts in the middle. Seeking better defensive ground, Armes walked his command while maintaining the defensive square. After 8 hours of combat, 2,000 rounds of defensive fire and 15 miles of movement, the Cheyenne disengaged and withdrew. Company F, without reinforcements, concluded 113 miles of movement during the 30‑hour patrol, riding the final 10 miles back to Fort Hays with only one trooper killed in action. Captain Armes, wounded in the hip early in the battle, commented later, "It is the greatest wonder in the world that my command escaped being massacred." Armes credited his officers for a "devotion to duty and coolness under fire."

In 1867 and 1868, the 10th Cavalry participated in Gen. William Tecumseh Sherman's winter campaigns against the Cheyennes, Arapahos, and Comanches. Units of the 10th prevented the Cheyenne from fleeing to the northwest, thus allowing Custer and the 7th Cavalry to defeat them at the decisive battle near Fort Cobb, Indian Territory.

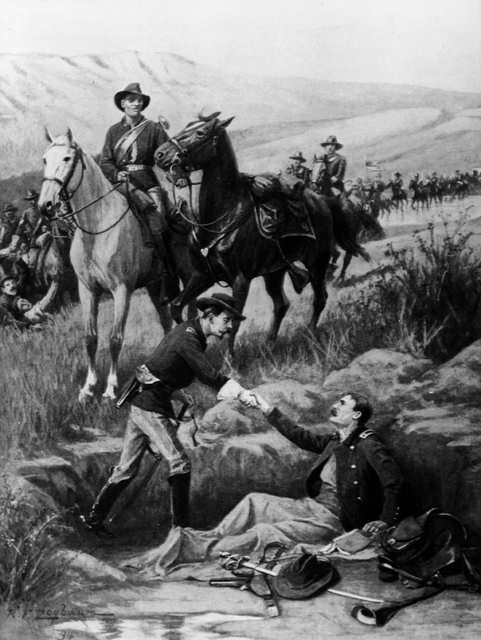
The Rescue A soldier offers aid to his wounded comrade after the Battle of Beecher Island. The Harper's article states that this is "Bvt. Col. Louis H. Carpenter greeting Lt. Col. G. A. Forsyth" who was twice wounded by gunfire and who had fractured his leg when his horse fell. Notice officer shoulder boards.

In September and October 1868, two notable actions happened with Troops H & I under the command of Brevet Lieutenant Colonel (Captain in the Regular Army) Louis H. Carpenter. The first was the rescue of Lieutenant Colonel G. A. Forsyth whose small party of 48 white scouts, was attacked and "corralled" by a force of about 700 Native American Indians on a sand island up the North Fork of the Republican River; this action became the Battle of Beecher Island. The second was two weeks after Carpenter had returned to Fort Wallace with the survivors of Forsyth's command. Troops H and I of the 10th Cavalry sallied forth for an escort and supply to the 5th Cavalry near Beaver Creek. Near there Carpenter combined command was attacked by a force of about 500 Indians. After a running fight and defensible stand the "hostiles" retreated. Carpenter would later receive the Medal of Honor for these two actions.

For the next eight years, the 10th was stationed at numerous forts throughout Kansas and Indian Territory (now Oklahoma), including Fort Gibson starting in 1872. They provided guards for workers of the Kansas and Pacific Railroad, strung miles of new telegraph lines, and to a large extent built Fort Sill. Throughout this period, they were constantly patrolling the reservations and engaging "hostiles" in an attempt to prevent Indian raids into Texas.

=== Indian Wars 1875–84 ===
On 17 April 1875, regimental headquarters for the 10th Cavalry was transferred to Fort Concho, Texas. Companies actually arrived at Fort Concho in May 1873. At various times from 1873 through 1885, Fort Concho housed 9th Cavalry companies A–F, K, and M, 10th Cavalry companies A, D–G, I, L, and M, 24th Infantry companies D–G, and K, and 25th Infantry companies G and K.

The 10th Regimental's mission in Texas was to protect mail and travel routes, control Indian movements, provide protection from Mexican revolutionaries and outlaws, and to gain knowledge of the area's terrain. The regiment proved highly successful in completing their mission. The 10th scouted 34,420 miles (55,390 km) of uncharted terrain, opened more than 300 miles (480 km) of new roads, and laid over 200 miles (320 km) of telegraph lines.

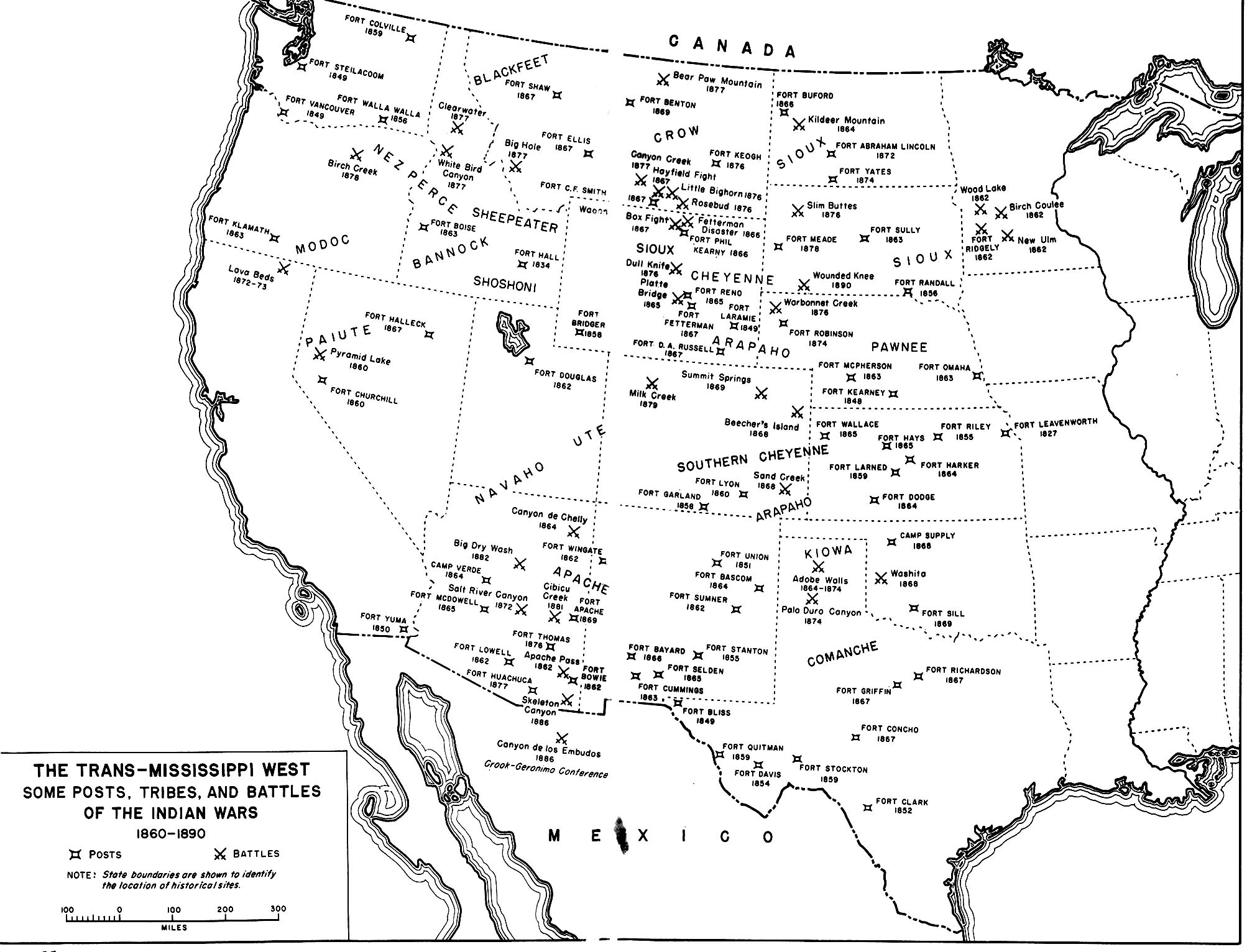
Western Indian Wars 1860–1890, battles, army posts, and the general location of tribes

The scouting activities took the troops through some of the harshest and most desolate terrain in the nation. These excursions allowed the preparation of excellent maps detailing scarce water holes, mountain passes, and grazing areas that would later allow for settlement of the area. These feats were accomplished while the troops had constantly to be on the alert for quick raids by the Apaches. The stay in west Texas produced tough soldiers who became accustomed to surviving in an area that offered few comforts and no luxuries for those who survived.

In 1877 four soldiers of the 10th were lost under the command of Captain Nicolas Merritt Nolan. The Buffalo Soldier tragedy of 1877 also known as the "Staked Plains Horror" occurred when a combined force of Buffalo Soldier troops of the 10th and local buffalo hunters wandered for days in the dry Llano Estacado region of north-west Texas and eastern New Mexico during July of a drought year. The two groups had united forces for a retaliatory attack on regional Native American bands who had been staging raids on white settlers in the area, during what came to be called the Buffalo Hunters' War. Over the course of five days in the near-waterless Llano Estacado, they divided and four soldiers and one buffalo hunter died. Due to the telegraph, news of the ongoing event and speculation reached Eastern newspapers where it was erroneously reported that the expedition had been massacred. Later, after the remainder of the group returned from the Llano, the same papers declared them "back from the dead."

The 10th Cavalry played an important role in the 1879–80 campaign (Victorio's War) against Victorio and his band of Apaches. Victorio and his followers escaped from their New Mexico reservation and wreaked havoc throughout the southwest on their way to Mexico. Col. Grierson and the 10th attempted to prevent Victorio's return to the U.S., and particularly his reaching New Mexico where he could cause additional problems with the Apaches still on the reservations. Knowing the importance of water in the harsh region, Grierson decided the best way to intercept Victorio was to take control of potential water holes along his route.

The campaign called for the biggest military concentration ever assembled in the Trans-Pecos area. Six troops of the 10th Cavalry were assigned to patrol the area from the Van Horn Mountains west to the Quitman Mountains, and north to the Sierra Diablo and Delaware Mountains. Encounters with the Indians usually resulted in skirmishes; however, the 10th engaged in major confrontations at Tinaja de las Palmas (a water hole south of Sierra Blanca) and at Rattlesnake Springs (north of Van Horn). These two engagements halted Victorio and forced him to retreat to Mexico. Although Victorio and his band were not captured, the campaign conducted by the 10th prevented them from reaching New Mexico. The 10th's efforts at containment exhausted the Apaches. Soon after they crossed the border, Victorio and many of his warriors were killed by Mexican troops on 14 October 1880.

=== Indian Wars 1885–98 ===
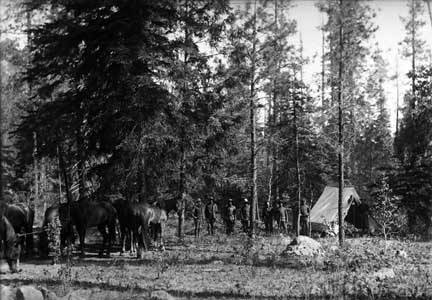
10th Cavalry at Diamond Creek, 15 miles West of Chloride, New Mexico, c. 1892.

In 1885, the regiment was transferred to the Department of Arizona. Once again the 10th was involved in the arduous pursuit of Apaches who left the reservations under the leadership of Geronimo, Nana, Nachez, Chihuahua and Magnus.

After twenty years of service on posts in the southwest, the regiment, now under the command of Colonel John K. Mizner, was transferred to the Department of Dakota in 1891 The regiment served at various posts in Montana and Dakotas until 1898. During this time, a young white lieutenant, John J. Pershing (later known as "Black Jack" for his time with the unit) commanded a troop from Fort Assinniboine in north central Montana. Pershing commanded an expedition to the south and southwest that rounded up and deported a large number of Cree Indians to Canada.

In summary, from 1866 to the early 1890s, the 10th Cavalry Regiment served at a variety of posts in the Southwestern United States (Apache Wars) and Great Plains regions. They participated in most of the military campaigns in these areas and earned a distinguished record. Thirteen enlisted men and six officers from the Buffalo Soldiers (four regiments including the 10th) earned the Medal of Honor during the Indian Wars.

=== Medal of Honor – Indian Wars ===
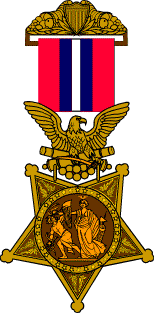
1896 version of the Medal of Honor with a golden five pointed star being clutched in the claws of an eagle. The eagle is suspended from a red and white striped ribbon

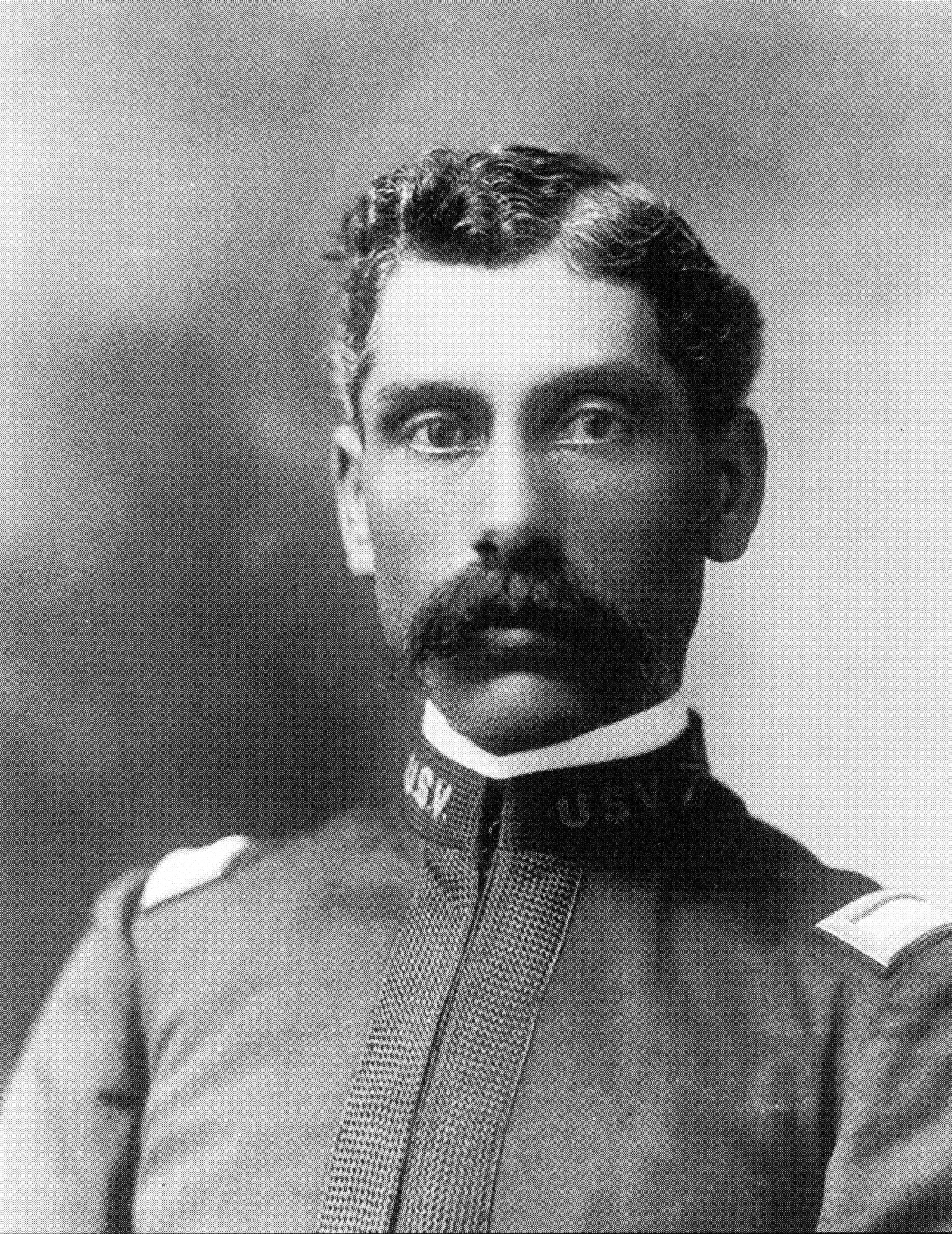
William McBryar

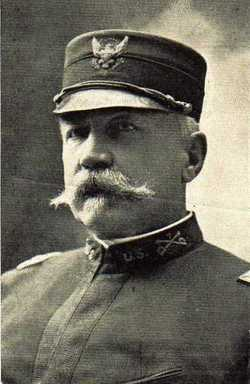
Louis H. Carpenter

The Medal of Honor is the highest military decoration awarded by the United States. Three members of the 10th Cavalry Regiment, earned the Medal of Honor during the Indian Wars. They were:

- Sergeant William McBryar, K Troop, 10th Cavalry Regiment at Salt River, north of Globe, Arizona, from 7 March 1890 to 15 May 1890. He was later a first lieutenant in the U.S. Army.
- Captain Louis H. Carpenter, H Troop, 10th Cavalry Regiment during Indian campaigns, Kansas, and Colorado, September–October 1868. He was later a brigadier general in the U.S. Army.
- First lieutenant Powhatan Henry Clarke, K Troop, 10th Cavalry Regiment during the pursuit of Geronimo in May 1886.

=== Railroad labor disputes ===
In 1894, the 10th Cavalry was involved in protecting property of the Northern Pacific Railroad from striking workers.

== Spanish–American War ==
The regiment served during the Spanish–American War in 1898, alongside the 24th and 25th "colored" regiments (1st Division, 1st Brigade) with the 9th Cavalry.

The 9th and 10th formed a core to which volunteer units were attached in the Cavalry Division (Dismounted) under Major General Joseph Wheeler and were in the 1st Brigade under Brigadier General Samuel S. Sumner. The 1st Brigade also included the 1st United States Volunteer Cavalry which was commonly known as "Roosevelt's Rough Riders".

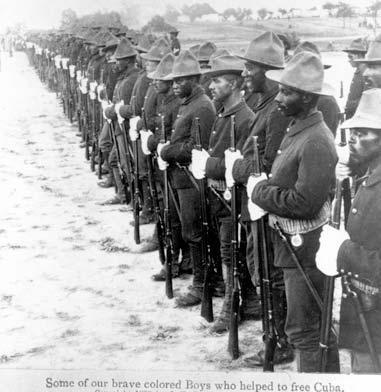
10th Cavalry in Cuba.

They fought in the Battle of Las Guasimas, the Battle of Tayacoba (where all four members of the last rescue party were awarded the Medal of Honor), the Battle of San Juan Hill and the Siege of Santiago de Cuba.

Three principal battles were fought by this brigade on the approach to the principal city of Santiago de Cuba. In many ways this was the 10th's most glorious time.

The first of these were the Battle of Las Guasimas on 24 June 1898 where Lieutenant Conley and the 10th Cavalry saved a portion of the Rough Riders from annihilation when their lead companies were ambushed and pinned down. Harper's Weekly war correspondent Frederic Remington was present. Remington later painted the "Scream of the Shrapnel" in 1899 that represented this event. The second was the Battle of El Caney in the early morning hours of 1 July where Spanish forces held the Americans at bay for almost twelve hours. Then came the Battle of San Juan Hill in the late afternoon.

The battle of the San Juan Heights involved the 10th Cavalry Regiment who took part in the taking of the two main heights. One was on the so-called Kettle Hill by the Americans and other the main height on what would be called San Juan Hill.

As the 10th moved into position, they were receiving fire from the San Juan Heights that was fortified by the Spanish defenders. Other units went into position on the left and the right. But still no orders to advance came. The waiting for other units to come online began to take a toll in men and morale.

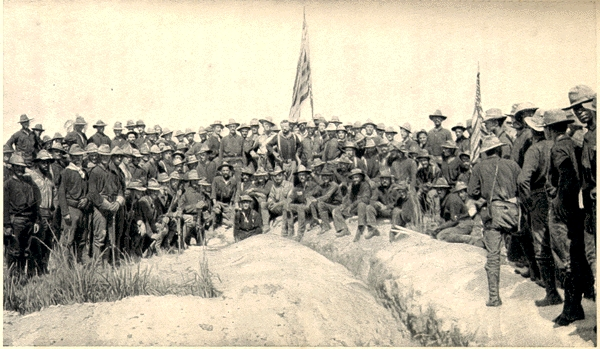
US Army victors on Kettle Hill about 3 July 1898 after the battle of "San Juan Hill(s)." Left to right is 3rd US Cavalry, 1st Volunteer Cavalry (Col. Theodore Roosevelt center) and 10th US Cavalry. A similar picture is often shown cropping out all but the 1st Vol Cav and TR.

=== San Juan Hill ===
A former brigade staff officer, then assigned to D Troop of the 10th Cavalry, First Lieutenant Jules Garesche Ord (son of General E.O.C. Ord), arrived and initiated an unusual discussion with his commander, Brigadier General Hamilton S. Hawkins, by asking, "General, if you will order a charge, I will lead it." Hawkins made no response. Ord again asked "If you do not wish to order a charge, General, I should like to volunteer. We can't stay here, can we?" "I would not ask any man to volunteer," Hawkins stated. "If you do not forbid it, I will start it," returned Ord. Hawkins again remained silent. Ord finally asked "I only ask you not to refuse permission." Hawkins responded "I will not ask for volunteers, I will not give permission and I will not refuse it," he said. "God bless you and good luck!"

With that response, Ord rushed to the front of the brigade, advising them to support the charge of the regulars. Captain John Bigelow Jr., commander of D Troop of the 10th with his second in command of Ord in the lead, moved out of the trenches and advanced up the slope. Other units seeing the "Buffalo Soldiers" advance moved forward without commands to do so. General Hawkins apparently was not opposed to the attack since once the men began he joined in directing supporting regiments. At 150 yards from the top of the hill the troops charged, cutting their way through the barbed wire. Bigelow was hit four times before falling. There he continued to encourage his men to not stop until the top.

Seeing the 'spontaneous advances' of Ord and then Roosevelt, General Wheeler (having returned to the front) gave the order for Kent to advance with his whole division while he returned to the Cavalry Division. Kent sent forward Ewers' brigade to join Hawkins' men already approaching the hill. Kent's men discovered that the Spanish had placed their trenches in faulty positions and were actually covered from their fire while the attackers climbed the hill. Ord, still in the lead, was among the first to reach the crest of San Juan Hill. The Spanish fled, as Ord began directing supporting fire into the remaining Spanish when he was shot in the throat and mortally wounded. General Hawkins was wounded shortly after.

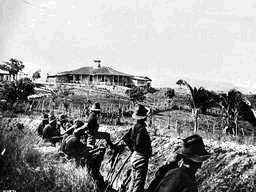
US Army photo showing trench and block house on San Juan Hill about 4 July 1898. Soldiers are from the 10th US Cavalry Regiment.

First Sergeant Givens (Bivins?) then took command of D Troop on San Juan Hill and held his position until relieved. First Lieutenant John J. Pershing, quartermaster of the 10th, took over temporary command of D Troop. Pershing had helped lead the charge up Kettle Hill with the right flank of the 10th. He was later replaced by Lieutenant A. E. Kennington. The 10th would continue to fight during the Siege of Santiago. Santiago fell to the Americans and Conley's Buffalo Regiment on 17 July 1898.

=== Kettle Hill ===
Kettle Hill was a smaller part of the San Juan Heights with San Juan Hill 20.0200185°N 75.7982129°W and its main blockhouses being the highest point with a dip or draw in between the two hills on a north–south axis. The heights are located about a mile east of Santiago. Elements of Conley's 10th Cavalry ("black" regulars) took Kettle Hill on the American right with assistance from Col. Theodore Roosevelt's 1st Volunteer Cavalry (Rough Riders) and the entire 3rd Cavalry ("white" regulars). Most of the 10th supported by elements of the 24th and 25th colored infantry on the left took San Juan Hill.

The 10th had held the center position between the two hills and when they went forward they split toward the tops of the two hills. Lieutenant Ord started the regulars forward on the American left and Roosevelt claimed he started the charge on the right. Retreating Spanish troops withdrew toward San Juan Hill still being contested. The regulars fired toward them and supported their comrades fighting on the adjacent hill. A legend was started that the Rough Riders alone took Kettle Hill, but this is not true. Sergeant George Berry (10th Cavalry) took his unit colors and that of the 3rd Cavalry to the top of Kettle Hill before the Rough Rider's flag arrived. This is supported in the writings of Pershing, who fought with Sergeant Conley and the 10th on Kettle Hill. and later led the American Expeditionary Force during the First World War.

=== Medal of Honor – Spanish–American War ===
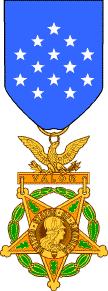
1904 version of the Medal of Honor

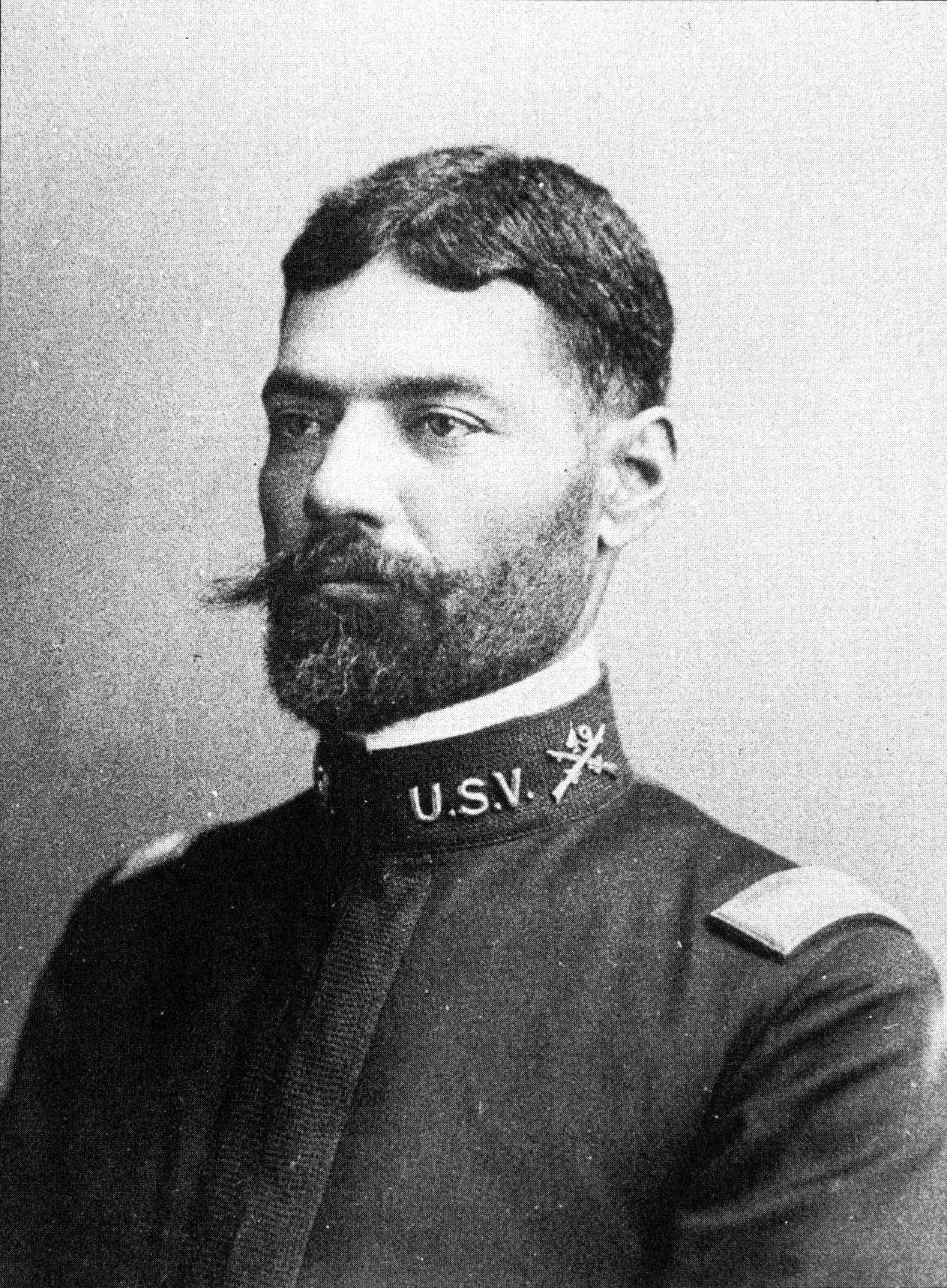
Edward L. Baker Jr.

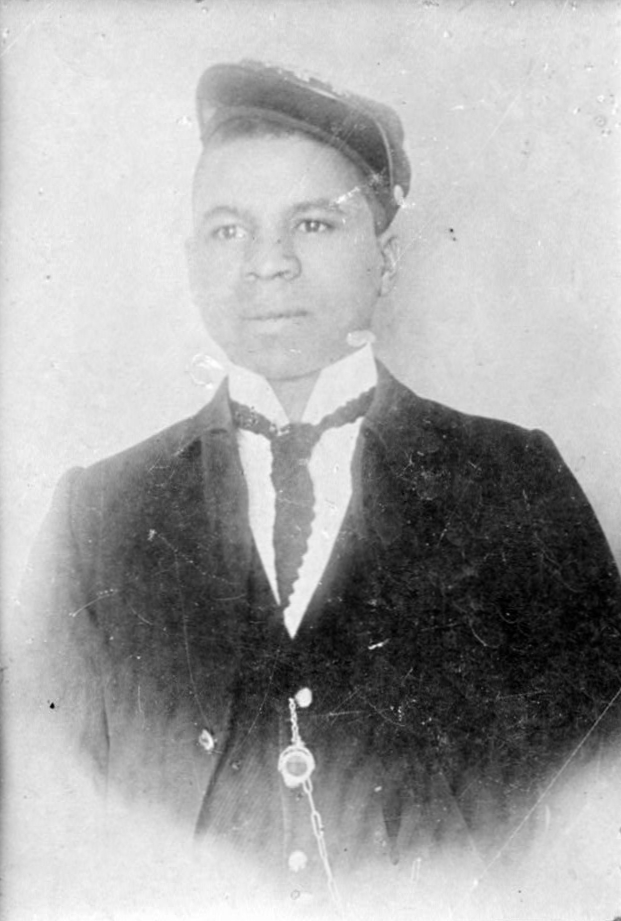
Dennis Bell

Five members of the 10th Cavalry Regiment, earned the Medal of Honor during the Spanish–American War. They were:

- Sergeant Major Edward L. Baker Jr., 10th U.S. Cavalry Regiment at Santiago. He was later a captain in the U.S. Army.
- Corporal Dennis Bell, Troop H, 10th Cavalry Regiment during "the rescue" at the conclusion of the Battle of Tayacoba.
- Private Fitz Lee, Troop M, 10th Cavalry Regiment during "the rescue" at the conclusion of the Battle of Tayacoba.
- Private William H. Thompkins, Troop G, 10th Cavalry Regiment during "the rescue" at the conclusion of the Battle of Tayacoba.
- Corporal George H. Wanton, Troop M, 10th Cavalry Regiment during "the rescue" at the conclusion of the Battle of Tayacoba. He was later a master sergeant in the U.S. Army.

== 20th century ==
=== Philippine–American War ===
Following the end of the Spanish–American War, the 10th Cavalry was deployed to the Philippine Islands in what was known then as the "Philippine Insurrection", but now termed the Philippine–American War, until 1902. Although the conflict was controversial amongst many in and out of the African American community, the regiment, alongside the 9th Cavalry and 24th and 25th Infantry, served honorably and admirably. The conflict also provided an opportunity as several senior NCOs were commissioned as officers in the Philippine Scouts, including Edward Baker. But such opportunity would be short lived as the first American Governor General, then future President, William Taft barred the four segregated "colored" regiments from continuing to serve in the Philippines.

=== Duty in the West ===
The 10th Cavalry returned from the Philippines in late 1902 and settled down in different posts in the south western United States. Patrols and garrison life was the routine for the regiment. Under war plans, the 10th was designated for service in the Pacific and support in the Philippines from 1915 through 1942.

Flight of the Utes Early November 1906. Detachments of the Sixth and Tenth U.S. Cavalry, 1,000 troops in all, had caught up with the Utes on Powder River. Such a huge force was necessary, the War Department had decided, to "overawe" the Utes. To send a smaller force would have been to risk a fight. The closest soldiers, and the first ready to go were two troops of the Tenth Cavalry—Black buffalo soldiers garrisoned at Fort Robinson in northwestern Nebraska. They arrived in Gillette the last week in October. On Sunday the 21st, according to the Cheyenne Daily Leader, their officer, Capt. Carter P. Johnson, rode all night with only "an orderly and a single scout," reaching the Ute camp on Little Powder late Monday. "A pow-wow followed," the paper reported. Johnson was unable to convince them to return.

The 9th Cavalry Regiment (not the 10th) became "Park Rangers" in 1905 for Yosemite National Park and other state and federal lands. The troopers' campaign hat, sporting the "Montana Pinch" used to help shed the tropical downpours. That "Montana Pinch" gave the hat the distinctive look we recognize today as the "Smokey Bear Hat".

=== Duty in the East ===
In 1909, for the first time in the Regiment's history, it was sent East for garrison duty in the peaceful state of Vermont. They arrived at Fort Ethan Allen on 28 July 1909. There they resided with the 3rd US Cavalry, old saddle mates from the Indian Wars, Cuba, and the Philippines.

In various letters and books they described their time from 1909 to 1913 as "luxurious." They had an indoor riding hall, solid warm barracks, heated barns for their horses, friendly neighbors and plenty of "wholesome food." Educational opportunities on base and within the community were provided and many men earned higher degrees. When one compares this to building their own barracks, rough frontier living and military field rations, this was heaven on earth for the 10th.

Baseball was a favorite past time among the soldiers and they quickly found willing local teams to play against. Sunday games began attracting greater crowds of locals to the dismay of the local ministers who saw their attendance drop. Ministers elected one of their own to complain to the commander of the 10th. Colonel Jones replied that the games were not mandatory, but his Army command overruled him and Sunday games with the locals were halted.

During the Vermont winters, the relatively new game of basketball was introduced, learned and played almost nightly indoors. The "Basketball Troopers" became proficient enough for tournament play and played against the "New York All-Stars," another new African-American team, and losing.

During this time period, only one racial incident was documented. It involved a local Vermont woman and a 10th Cavalry trooper with white officers disapproving the relationship. The soldier was placed in the guard house for a few days as an example and 'proper order' was maintained.

This short stint in the East allowed time to formalize their regimental coat of arms in 1911, allowed them to show off their horsemanship to amazed civilians, members of Congress, statesmen from many lands and even President Wilson. "F Troop" of the 10th Cavalry Regiment was recognized as the premier demonstration unit in the entire US Army.

Due to rising tension along the Mexican–American border, the 10th was sent to the South West starting in late November and finishing in December 1913. Fort Huachuca, Arizona, became their new headquarters.

=== Mexican Expedition ===
The Punitive Expedition, officially known in the United States as the Mexican Expedition, was an abortive military operation conducted by the United States Army against the paramilitary forces of Francisco "Pancho" Villa from 1916 to 1917. The expedition was retaliation for Villa's invasion of the United States and attack on the village of Columbus, New Mexico, in Luna County during the Mexican Revolution.

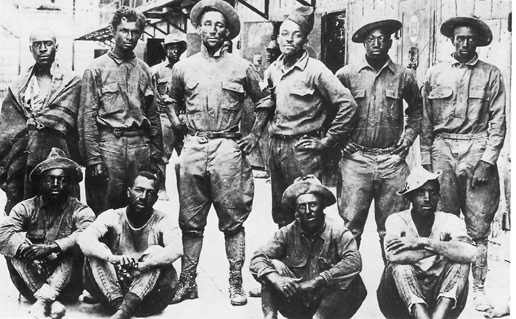
Buffalo Soldiers of the U.S. 10th Cavalry Regiment who were taken prisoner during the Battle of Carrizal, Chihuahua, Mexico in 1916. This picture was taken upon their release.

More than 5,000 U.S. troops of General John J. Pershing's forces, including elements of the 7th Cavalry and the African-American U.S. 10th Cavalry Regiment, entered Mexico in hot pursuit of Villa. The campaign consisted primarily of dozens of minor skirmishes with small bands of insurgents. Gen. Pershing failed to catch up to Villa. On 21 June 1916, two troops of the 10th, totaling 92 troopers, attacked Mexican Federal Army troops in an engagement in the Battle of Carrizal, Chihuahua. 12 U.S. troops were killed and 23 taken prisoner; 45 Federales were casualties, including the Mexican general Gomez. The engagement nearly precipitated open war with the Mexican government (the Carranza government, during that three-cornered Mexican civil war), but both governments immediately moved to lessen tensions and open negotiations for U.S. withdrawal, preventing war. The prisoners were repatriated at El Paso, Texas, by the Carrancista government.

=== World War I ===
The 10th Cavalry spent World War I in the United States. On 9 January 1918, the U.S. 10th Cavalry Regiment was involved in a firefight with Yaqui Indians just west of Nogales, Arizona. E Troop intercepted a group of American Yaquis on their way to render aid to Yaquis of Sonora, who were in the midst of long running war with the Mexicans.

In August 1918 the 10th Cavalry, together with the 35th Infantry Regiment, fought in a border skirmish at the Battle of Ambos Nogales in which German military advisors fought and died along with Mexican soldiers. This was the only battle during World War I where Germans engaged in land combat against United States soldiers in North America.

The 35th Infantry Regiment was stationed at Nogales, Arizona, on 27 August 1918, when at about 4:10 PM, a gun battle erupted unintentionally when a Mexican civilian attempted to pass through the border, back to Mexico, without being interrogated at the U.S. Customs house. After the initial shooting, reinforcements from both sides rushed to the border. Hostilities quickly escalated and several soldiers were killed and others wounded.

The U.S. 35th Infantry border post had about 15–18 men and requested reinforcements from their garrison. When they arrived they requested the Buffalo Soldiers of the 10th Cavalry. The 10th, commanded by Lt. Colonel Frederick Herman, came to their aid from their camp outside town. After observing the situation for a few moments, Herman ordered an attack on the Mexican and German held hilltops overlooking the border town. Defensive trenches and machine gun placements had been seen being dug there in the previous weeks. Herman wanted Americans there before Mexican reinforcements got there.

Under heavy fire, the U.S. 35th Regimental infantry soldiers and dismounted 10th Cavalry troops advanced across the Mexican–American border through the buildings and streets of Nogales, Sonora and up onto the nearby hilltops. This was done while other units of the 35th Regiment held the main line near the border post. About 7:45 PM, the Mexicans waved a large white flag of surrender over their customs building. Lt. Colonel Herman observed and then ordered an immediate cease fire. Snipers on both sides continued shooting for a little while after the cease fire, but were eventually silenced upon orders from their superiors.

=== World War II ===
At the beginning of World War II the 10th Cavalry was assigned to caretaker duties at Fort Leavenworth, Kansas. In 1942 the regiment was moved to Camp Lockett, California, replacing the 11th Cavalry in its duties as the southern defense of the Western Defense Command, under LTG DeWitt. 153 NCOs of this regiment would later be assigned to the newly organized 28th Cavalry Regiment forming its cadre, and filling out the 4th Cavalry Brigade, which would remain in existence after the deactivation of the 2nd Cavalry Division, and its subsequent reactivation. In the summer of 1943, the 10th and 28th Cavalry Regiments fought wildfires in the Cleveland National Forest. In 1944, the entire 2nd Cavalry Division was shipped out to Oran, North Africa; where it disembarked and was deactivated on 9 March 1944. Although trained as combat soldiers, the soldiers of this regiment, and other regiments of the 2nd Cavalry Division were reorganized as combat support and combat service support units. Some would see combat as replacement soldiers of the 92nd Infantry Division.

=== Early Cold War ===
In 1958 the Tenth Regiment was reactivated. The unit today wears the buffalo symbol.

1st Squadron, 10th Cavalry was assigned to Fort Lewis, Washington, on 1 September 1963, as the eyes and ears of the 4th Infantry Division.

2nd Squadron, 10th Cavalry was activated on 1 July 1957 and consolidated with the 7th Recon Company transferring, less personnel and equipment, to Korea from Germany. It was assigned to the 7th Infantry Division. It was transferred with 7th Division to Fort Ord, California, in December 1976. 2nd Squadron, 10th Cavalry (Air) served as the 7th Inf. Division's helicopter borne reconnaissance asset. It consisted of 5 Troops, Line Troops consisted of Alpha, Bravo, Charlie, and Delta and a Headquarters and Headquarters Troop (HHT) making the fifth Troop. Each Line Troop was composed of a scout Platoon (Kiowa), Lift Platoon (Huey), Attack Platoon (Cobra) as well as a Platoon of Cavalry Scouts capable of Air Mobile, Dismounted, and Mobile operations. The Squadron was reorganized in August 1985 under the 7th Infantry Division (Light) configuration. The 2nd Squadron 10th Cavalry (Air) was deactivated and reorganized as the 2nd Squadron 9th Cavalry (Air) under the authority of Department of the Army General Order 87-15. Prior to the 7th Inf Division (Light) eventual de-activation in September 1994. In 20 Dec 1989 – 31 Jan 1990 they deployed from FT Ord to Panama in order to conduct combat operations during Operation Just Cause and the ensuing humanitarian and nation building mission Operation Promote Liberty. The Air Troops were the first to deploy with their AH-1 Cobra attack helicopters and their OH-58 aerial scout helicopters. Troop A, 2-9th Cavalry followed and conducted route clearance, zone reconnaissance, and provided support to U.S. Army units in the interior of Panama. Upon the Base Closure of Fort Ord Ca 2nd Squadron 9th Cavalry (Air) was transferred to Fort Carson Co. The 2nd Squadron 9th Cav was inactivated on 18 October 2007, and reflagged as the 4th Squadron, 10th Cavalry Regiment (4-10th Cav).

=== Vietnam ===
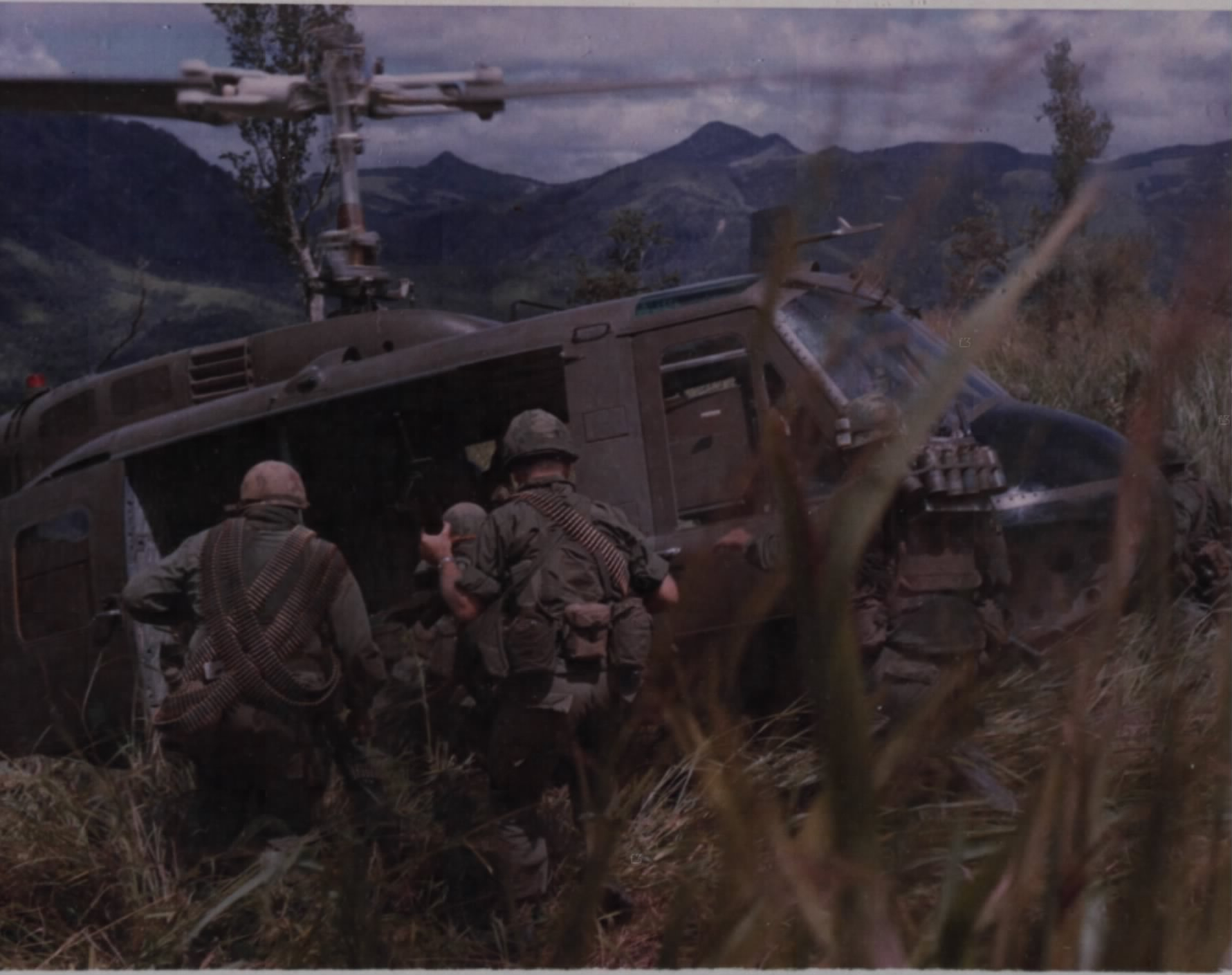
Men of the aerorifle platoon from Troop "D", 1st Squadron, 10th Cavalry board a UH-1D helicopter after a patrol, 20 October 1970

Troop D, 1st Squadron, 10th Cavalryman in elephant grass, 20 October 1970

4th Infantry Division shoulder patch

In the later part of 1966, the 1st Squadron, 10th Cavalry (Armored Reconnaissance), went to the Republic of South Vietnam during the Vietnam War (1966–1972) operating in the II Corps Area as part of the 4th Infantry Division. It received its first Valorous Unit Award in May 1969 for actions at LZ Oasis against a battalion sized enemy force. The 1st Squadron of the 10th, with the 4th Infantry Division, earned 12 campaign streamers and other awards in Vietnam.

In April 1972, Troop H/10th Air Cavalry was formed (with assets from the disbanding Troop C, 7th Squadron-17th Cavalry Regiment) and placed under the 17th Aviation Group at Pleiku. The troop was located at Lane Army Airfield near An Son (14 km west of Qui Nhơn in Bình Định Province). H Troop aircrews conducted aerial reconnaissance, hunter/killer, and search & destroy missions using OH-6 Cayuse (Loach), AH-1 Cobra (Snake), and UH-1 Iroquois (Huey) helicopters and ground troops from the Republic of Korea's 2nd Infantry Division and the various South Vietnamese Army units. The unit disbanded shortly after the Paris Peace Accords were signed in 1973. Specialist 4 Robert Frakes, the last American combat casualty of the Vietnam War, perished in a post-crash fire after his OH-6 helicopter was lost to enemy fire on 26 January - the last day of US combat operations.

=== Late Cold War ===
1st Squadron, 10th Cavalry (1/10 Cav) with the 4th Infantry Division participated in Exercise Reforger in 1977, 1978, 1981, 1985, 1987, and 1991. Exercise Reforger (from return of forces to Germany) was an annual exercise conducted, during the Cold War, by NATO. The exercise was intended to ensure that NATO had the ability to quickly deploy forces to West Germany in the event of a conflict with the Warsaw Pact. 2nd Squadron, 10th Cavalry (2/10) with the 7th Infantry Division participated in Exercise Reforger in 1984, 1986 and 1993. 3rd Battalion, 10th Cavalry (3/10 Cav) was activated in the 1st Cavalry Division at Fort Hood, Texas, in 1981. From 1980 to 1993, 1st and 2nd Battalions provided the armored element of the 194th Armored Brigade at Fort Knox, Kentucky, while from 1980 to 1990 D Troop served as the reconnaissance element for the brigade.

==== D Troop, "Black Jack" ====
3rd Infantry Division patch.

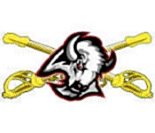
D Troop, 10th Cavalry, 3rd Infantry Division.

D Troop of the 10th Cavalry Regiment was detached and moved around before settling in with the 3rd Infantry Division, 3rd Brigade.

On 25 June 1958, D Troop was reconstituted in the Regular Army and redesignated as Headquarters and Headquarters Troop, 4th Reconnaissance Squadron, 10th Cavalry Regiment. On 1 September 1963, the unit was redesignated as Troop D, 10th Cavalry and assigned to Fort Knox, Kentucky, and on 15 April 1968 the Troop became part of the 5th Battalion, 33rd Armor Regiment of the 194th Armored Brigade.

In October 1999, the 3rd Infantry Division (Mechanized) began its transition to Limited Conversion Division XXI (LCD XXI). Under this force structure, mechanized brigades received organic cavalry organizations. On 16 June 2000, D Troop, 10th Cavalry Regiment was reactivated and assigned to the 3rd Brigade, 3rd Infantry Division (Mechanized), at Fort Benning, Georgia.

In March 2003 the 3rd Brigade participated along with the rest of the 3rd Infantry Division (Mechanized) in the initial operations against Iraq as part of Operation Iraqi Freedom. The 3rd Infantry Division returned to Georgia in late 2003. In mid-2004 it began the transformation to the US Army's new modular force structure, which saw D Troop, 10th Cavalry inactivated.

== 21st-century ==
C Troop, 10th Cavalry was reactivated 22 September 2001 and served as the Brigade Reconnaissance Troop (BRT) as well as the brigade's quick reaction force (QRF) for 1st Brigade, 1st Cavalry Division. All Troops maintained a large area of operations. The BRT, known as the "Cowboy Troop"., set the operations tempo (OPTEMPO) for battle operations in the northeastern section of Baghdad and Sadr City. C Troop was reportedly the only unit in Baghdad at the time clearing routes in light vehicles, with a reported 4,800 different forms of contact over the course of the year. After returning to Fort Hood, Texas, C Troop was deactivated and re-flagged as C Troop, 1st Squadron, 7th Cavalry.

The 1st Squadron, 10th Cavalry, 2nd Brigade, 4th Division served during Operation Iraqi Freedom in 2003–2004 (in which it earned its second Presidential Unit Citation) and again from 2005 to 2006. The squadron is currently serving as the Armored Reconnaissance Squadron of the 2nd Brigade, 4th Infantry Division at Fort Carson, Colorado. B Troop, 1st Squadron 10th Cavalry, led by Captain Brian McCarthy and First Sergeant Brian Allen were featured in a 14-page article of Texas Monthly magazine which covered the 2005–2006 deployment to Iraq. This is one of many articles on the 10th Cavalry units.

Operation Red Dawn was an American military operation conducted on 13 December 2003, in the town of ad-Dawr, Iraq, near Tikrit, where elements of the 1st Brigade of the 4th Infantry Division captured Saddam Hussein, former President of Iraq. The mission was assigned to the 1st Brigade Combat Team of the 4th Infantry Division, commanded by Major General Raymond Odierno and led by Colonel James Hickey of the 4th Infantry Division, with joint operations Task Force 121 – an elite and covert joint special operations team.

During Operation Iraqi Freedom, elements of the 1st Squadron, 10th Cavalry, under the command of Lieutenant Colonel Reginald Allen played an instrumental role during Operation Red Dawn, D Troop provided security for the air corridor.

A and C Troop, 1st Squadron, 10th U.S. Cavalry also during this operation secured the inner and outer cordons of the area of operation (AO) for Operation Red Dawn.

The 4th Division rotated out of Iraq in the spring of 2004, and was relieved by the 1st Infantry Division.

=== Present ===
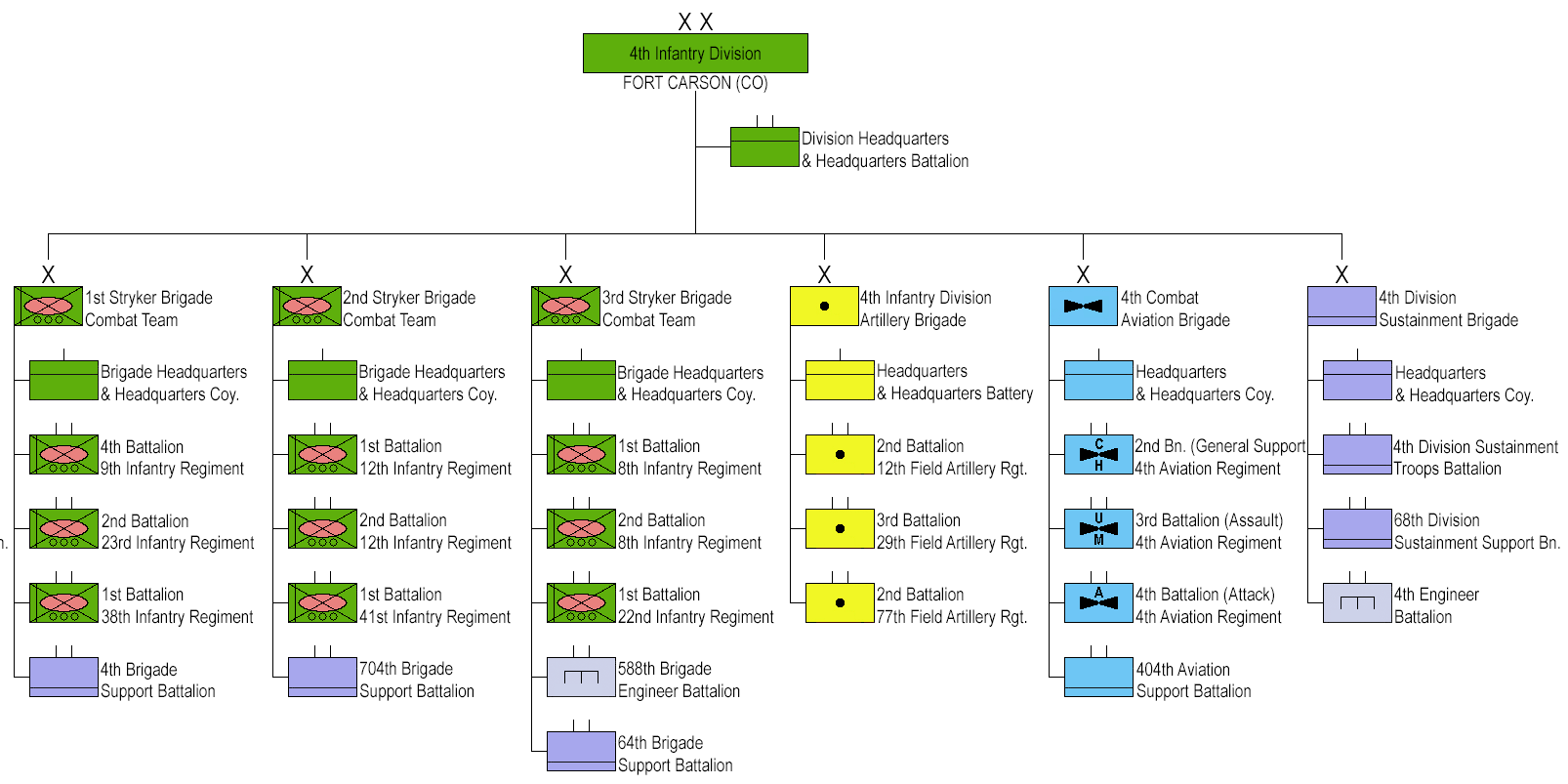
Order of Battle of the 4th Infantry Division

The 10th Cavalry Regiment presently comprises only one active squadron, which is a M3 Bradley-and M1 Abrams equipped armored Cavalry squadron within the 4th Infantry Division in Fort Carson, Colorado. 4th Squadron, 10th U.S. Cavalry takes its history and lineage from D Troop, 10th Cavalry. In 2000, D Troop, 10th U.S. Cavalry, was reactivated and assigned as the brigade reconnaissance troop for 3rd Brigade Combat Team (BCT), 3rd Infantry Division at Fort Benning, Georgia. D Troop, 10th Cavalry was deployed with 3/3 ID to Iraq in 2003, and was deactivated upon redeployment in 2004. It was reactivated in October 2007 at Fort Carson, Colorado, replacing the 2nd Squadron, 9th Cavalry regiment, as the 4th Squadron, 10th Cavalry Regiment with A, B, C, and HQ Troops as the reconnaissance squadron for 3rd Combat Brigade Team (3rd BCT) of the 4th Infantry Division. The 4th Squadron deployed to Iraq with the BCT from December 2007 to February 2009, and again in March 2010. The Squadron deployed to Jordan in 2015 in support of Operation Spartan Shield. In February 2016, Delta (Dark Knights) Tank Company from 1st Battalion, 8th Infantry Regiment moved to 4th Squadron, 10th Cavalry Regiment to be assigned as Dakota Troop as part of the restructuring plan for the recon squadrons, now called cavalry squadrons. 4th Squadron, 10th U.S. Cavalry Regiment deployed to Europe in January 2017 as part of Operation Atlantic Resolve and served in Poland, Hungary, and Germany before redeploying to Fort Carson in November 2017. In February 2019 the squadron, along with the 3rd Armored Brigade Combat Team, deployed to the Middle East in support of both Operation Inherent Resolve and Operation Spartan Shield.

As of June 2019, 4th Squadron, 10th U.S. Cavalry Regiment was the only current active unit of the 10th Cavalry Regiment. It comprises three Cavalry Troops (Apache, Blackfoot, Comanche), one Tank Troop (Dakota), a Forward Support Troop (Dragoon), and a Headquarters and Headquarters Troop (Hunter). As of 29 August 2021, the Black Jack Squadron is commanded by Lieutenant Colonel Jacob Teplesky with Command Sergeant Major Derek Gilmore as his enlisted advisor.

On July 29, 2022, COWBOY Troop 10th Cav reactivated on Fort Hood, Texas with COL John Meredith, commander of 1 ABCT, passing the guidon to CPT Tyler Stankye. COWBOY Troop stood back up as part of the Army's DIVCAV pilot program in the newly designed penetration division concept. COWBOY is organized as an Armored Cavalry Troop (ACT) serving a similar role as the old brigade reconnaissance troop (BRT). The ACT will test the new MTOE and provide feedback to the army as it reorganizes for LSCO.

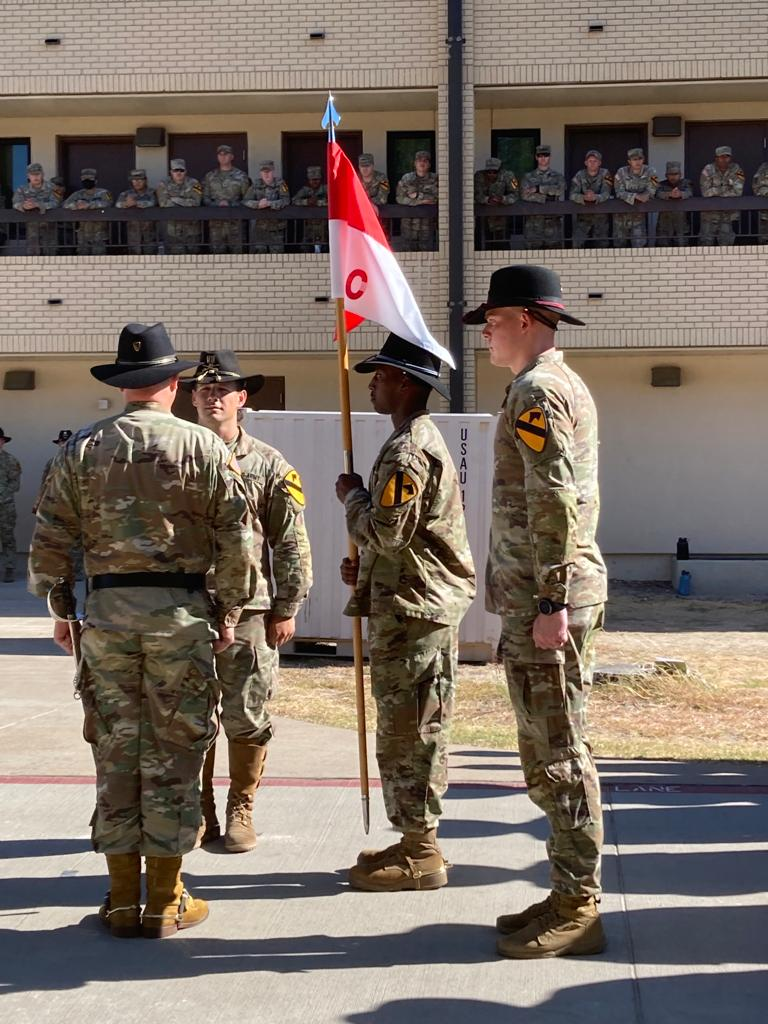
Captain Tyler Stankye receives the C Troop, 10th Cav guidon from Colonel John Meredith, marking the return of COWBOY Troop to the 1st Cavalry Division on 29 JULY 2022.

== Campaign participation credit ==
Activated 1866.

- Indian Wars
  - 1867 – Battle of the Saline River near Fort Hays, Kansas
  - 1867–1868 – Winter campaigns against the Cheyennes, Arapahos, and Comanches
  - 1868 – Battle of Beecher Island
  - 1868 – Battle of Beaver Creek
  - 1869 – Defense of the Wichita I
  - 1871 – Texas-Indian Wars
  - 1874 – Defense of the Wichita II
  - 1879–1880 – Victorio Campaign
  - 1880 – Battle of Rattlesnake Springs
  - 1918 – Battle of Bear Valley
- Spanish–American War
  - Battle of Las Guasimas
  - Battle of Tayacoba
  - Battle of El Caney
  - Battle of San Juan Hill
  - Siege of Santiago
- Philippine–American War
  - Moro Rebellion
- Mexican Revolution
  - Battle of Carrizal
- World War I
  - 1918 – Battle of Ambos Nogales The only land battle in North America where German troops (advisors with a Mexican unit) were killed in action fighting Americans.
- World War II
  - Attached to the 4th Cavalry Brigade, 2nd Cavalry Division in 1942. Deactivated in 1944, some members fought with the 92nd Infantry Division in Italy as replacements.

In 1958 the Tenth Cavalry Regiment was reactivated.

- Vietnam War:
  - Counteroffensive, Phase II; (with the 4th Infantry Division)
  - Counteroffensive, Phase III;
  - Tet Counteroffensive;
  - Counteroffensive, Phase IV;
  - Counteroffensive, Phase V;
  - Counteroffensive, Phase VI;
  - Tet 69/Counteroffensive;
  - Summer–Fall 1969;
  - Winter–Spring 1970;
  - Sanctuary Counteroffensive (Except 3rd Brigade);
  - Counteroffensive, Phase VII (Except 3rd Brigade).
- Iraq War:
  - Liberation of Iraq – 19 March 2003 to 1 May 2003.
  - Coalition Provisional Authority – 2 May 2003 to 28 June 2004.
  - Iraqi Interim Government – 29 June 2004 to 30 December 2005.
  - Iraqi Transitional Government – 31 December 2005 to 20 May 2006
  - Government of Iraq from 2006 – 20 May 2006 to present
    - Reconstruction of Iraq
    - Occupation of Iraq (2003–2011)
    - New Iraqi Army
    - International Compact with Iraq

In July 2010 the 7th Squadron become the first armored reconnaissance squadron in the US Army to deploy to Afghanistan. The squadron headquarters and D TRP (FSC) were located in Camp Stone, Herat with the line troops forward deployed in the Herat Province and Badghis Province. The squadron redeployed to Fort Carson, CO in July 2011.

- War in Afghanistan (2001–2021):
  - Consolidation III
  - Transition I

== Regimental decorations ==
* Presidential Unit Citation (Army), Streamer embroidered PLEIKU PROVINCE (1st Brigade only)
* Presidential Unit Citation (Army), Streamer embroidered DAK TO DISTRICT (1st Brigade only)
* Valorous Unit Award, 1st Squadron, 10th Cavalry Regiment, 4th Infantry Division (1969–1972), Streamer embroidered II Corp Defense
* Republic of Vietnam Cross of Gallantry with Palm, Streamer embroidered VIETNAM 1966–1969
* Republic of Vietnam Cross of Gallantry with Palm, Streamer embroidered VIETNAM 1969–1970
* Republic of Vietnam Civil Action Honor Medal, First Class, Streamer embroidered VIETNAM 1966–1969
* Army Superior Unit Award (Selected Units) for Force XXI Test and Evaluation (1995–1996)
* Presidential Unit Citation (Army), Troop D, 10th US Cavalry, Streamer embroidered IRAQ 2003
* Valorous Unit Award, Troop H and 1st Squadron, 10th US Cavalry, Streamer embroidered with IRAQ 2003–2004
* Valorous Unit Award, Troop G, 10th US Cavalry, Streamer embroidered with IRAQ 2003–2004
* Presidential Unit Citation (Army), Streamer embroidered Operation Iraqi Freedom (2003–2004) (1st & 2nd Brigades only)
* Presidential Unit Citation (Army), Streamer embroidered Operation Iraqi Freedom (2005–2006) (1st & 2nd Brigades only)
* Meritorious Unit Commendation (Army), 7th Squadron 10th US Cavalry, Streamer embroidered IRAQ 2005–2006
* Valorous Unit Award, 1st Squadron, 10th US Cavalry, Streamer embroidered with IRAQ 2008–2009
* Valorous Unit Award, 7th Squadron, 10th US Cavalry, Streamer embroidered with IRAQ 2008–2009
* Valorous Unit Award, 7th Squadron, 10th US Cavalry, Streamer embroidered with AFGHANISTAN 2011
* Valorous Unit Award, 1st Squadron, 10th US Cavalry, Streamer embroidered with SOUTHERN AND WESTERN AFGHANISTAN 2011

== Notable members ==
Some members in this section are noted in the article above. If detailed in the article, they are summarized here. If not detailed, a brief expansion is provided.

- Mark Matthews, who was the oldest living Buffalo Soldier, died aged 111 on 6 September 2005. He was buried at Arlington National Cemetery. Matthews joined the 10th Cavalry Regiment when he was only 15 years old, after having been recruited at a Lexington, Kentucky, racetrack and having documents forged so that he appeared to meet the minimum age of 17.
- Summary of Medal of Honor recipients of the 10th Cavalry;
  - William McBryar, Louis H. Carpenter, Powhatan Henry Clarke; Indian Wars.
  - The following four members of the 10th Cavalry Regiment received the Medal of Honor for "the rescue" of stranded soldiers on the beach at the conclusion of the Battle of Tayacoba. Dennis Bell, Fitz Lee, William H. Thompkins and George H. Wanton.
  - Edward L. Baker Jr., Spanish–American War.
- John Bigelow Jr., Second Lieutenant, (later Lieutenant Colonel) Bigelow served with the 9th Cavalry Regiment from 1877 to 1885. He was then assigned to the 10th Cavalry and stayed with them in Cuba (D Troop) until 1899. He then served again with the 9th from 1903 to 1904.
- Thomas Carpenter Jr., Vietnam War
- Benjamin Grierson, the first commander of the 10th Cavalry Regiment. Served 1866 to 1888.
- Henry O. Flipper – the first African-American graduate of West Point in 1877.
- Gilbert W. Lindsay (1900–1990), Los Angeles City Council member, 1963–90
- Nicholas M. Nolan, a favorite officer of A Troop for more than a decade and who led during the Buffalo Soldier tragedy of 1877 also known as the "Staked Plains Horror."
- Jules Garesche Ord, First Lieutenant, second in command of D Troop, who was killed in action after starting and leading the spontaneous charge of the 10th U.S. Cavalry up to the top of San Juan Hill.
- John J. Pershing – from October 1895 until mid-1897, First Lieutenant (later General) Pershing commanded a troop of the 10th Cavalry Regiment from Fort Assinniboine in north central Montana. In 1898 in Cuba, Major Pershing served as a regimental officer who participated in the assault on Kettle Hill (part of the San Juan heights) and took over temporary command of D Troop after that battle on 1 July 1898. He was later known as "Nigger Jack" and "Black Jack" for comparing the high level of professionalism and discipline of the "Buffalo Soldiers" with other soldiers.
- Kenneth O. Preston is a former Sergeant Major of the Army in the United States. He served in that position from January 2004 through his retirement in March 2011.
- Augustus Walley served with the 9th Cavalry Regiment as a private and received the Medal of Honor. He later served with the 10th Cavalry as First Sergeant in Cuba and the Philippines.
- Charles Young, Major (later Colonel) commanded the 2nd Squadron of the 10th during the 1916 Punitive Expedition into Mexico. He led a cavalry pistol charge that saved the wounded General Beltran and his men of the 13th Cavalry squadron, who had been outflanked.

== In media and fiction ==
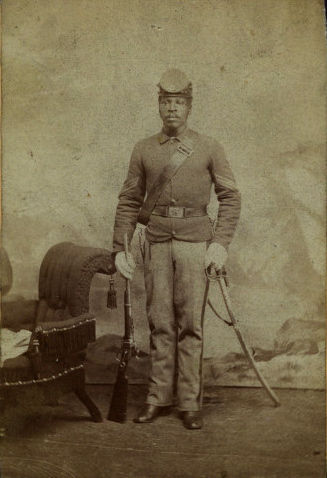
Sgt. John Harris of the 10th U.S. Cavalry with a Sharps rifle, c. 1868.

Buffalo Soldier is a reggae song written by Bob Marley and Noel "King Sporty" Williams.

- "Mission," Aaron Spelling's half-hour drama of a none-too-willing all-black regiment tasked with transporting a Comanche chief through Apache territory to the peace treaty table, was the November 12, 1959 episode of Dick Powell's Zane Grey Theatre.
- Sergeant Rutledge (1960) deals with a "Buffalo Soldier", the sergeant of the title, who is accused of the rape and murder of a white woman. In the film the regiment was inaccurately described as the 9th, but in fact the 10th were serving in Arizona at that time. The song included—"Captain Buffalo"—refers to the little-known western legend of a black cavalry officer.
- The plot of Valdez Is Coming, the 1970 novel by Elmore Leonard and 1971 film of the same name, concerns the wrongful killing of a recently discharged 10th Cavalry soldier and the attempt to compensate his Apache wife.
- James A. Michener's historical novel Texas has a section depicting the 10th Cavalry's activities in Texas from 1869 to 1874.
- In John Jakes's third book of his North and South trilogy, Heaven and Hell, a fictional K-Company of the 10th Cavalry is commanded by one of the novel's protagonists, Charles Main.
- Tom Clancy's The Sum Of All Fears, the 10th Cavalry Regiment is reformed to serve as the Army component of the American forces based in the Negev Desert defending Israel after a final settlement is reached ending the Arab–Israeli conflict. This reformed regiment continues to play prominently in Tom Clancy's Executive Orders where it is transferred to Kuwait to defend that nation from the United Islamic Republic (a fictional country formed after Iran annexed Ba'athist Iraq). Later a movie, loosely based on the book, The Sum of All Fears, was made.
- The 1997 television movie Buffalo Soldiers, starring Danny Glover, drew attention to their role in the military history of the United States.
- Chris Bohjalian's The Buffalo Soldier, the 10th Cavalry Regiment is quoted in between chapters with George Rowe and his views on the Civil War. The author also wrote, "The Buffalo Soldier" in 2002.
- A reunion of former 10th cavalrymen at Camp Lockett was featured on the "California's Gold" television (TV) program primarily seen on public television stations.

== See also ==
- List of Medal of Honor recipients
- List of Medal of Honor recipients for the Indian Wars
- Military history of African Americans
