= Bonham Hollow =

Valley in Tennessee, United States

Coordinates: 35.704175°N 84.898172°W

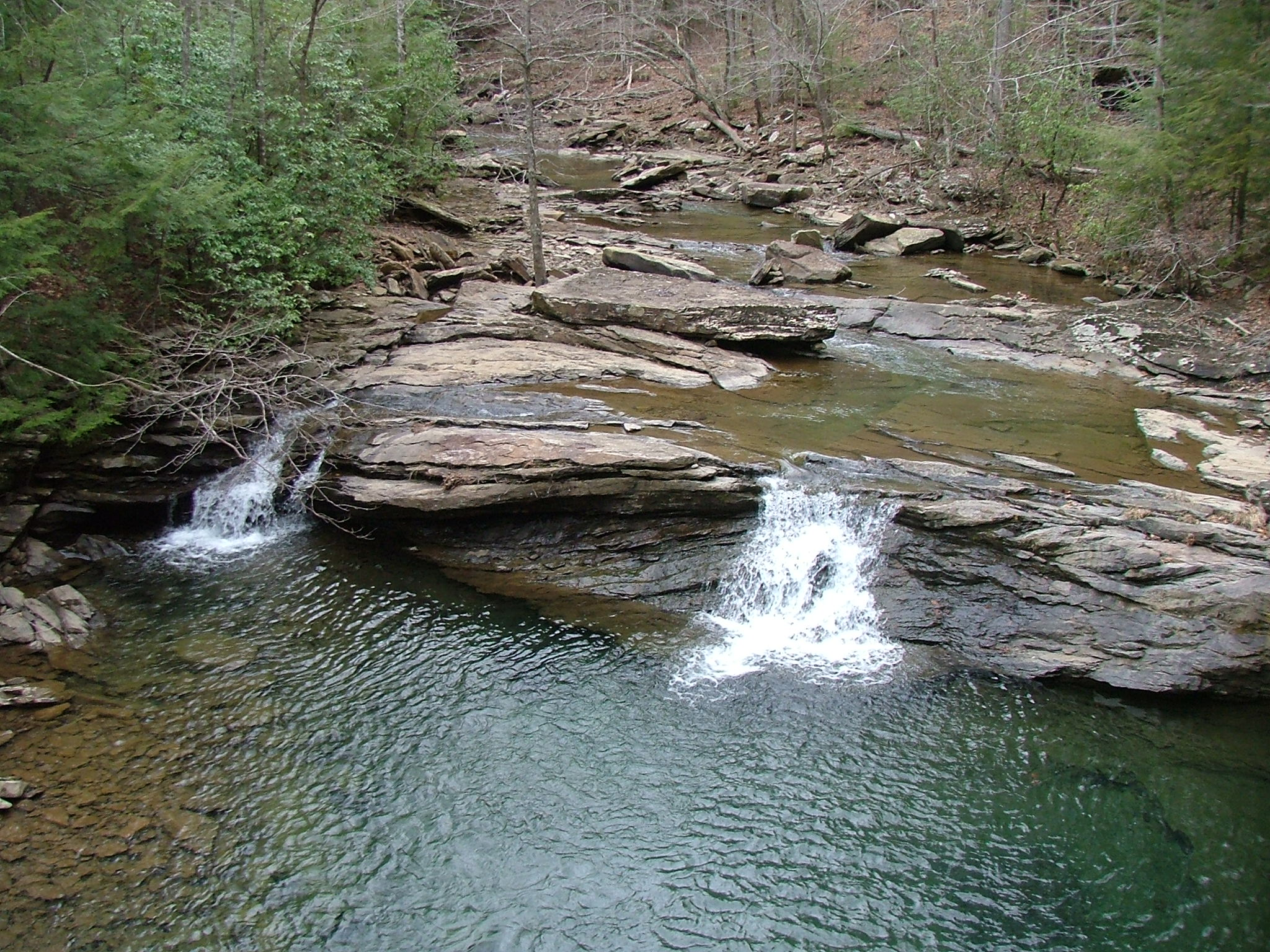
Small waterfall at Duskin Branch at Dead Negro Hollow

Dead Negro Hollow was a valley (hollow) in Rhea County, Tennessee, in the United States. It was renamed to Bonham Hallow on December 12, 2019.

According to legend, Dead Negro Hollow was so named in the 1870s when a black laborer was found murdered there after he had learned the location of a gold mine.
