= Thomas O'Connell =

Thomas O'Connell may refer to:

- Thomas O'Connell (Medal of Honor) (1842–1899), American Civil War sailor
- Thomas J. O'Connell (1882–1969), Irish Labour party politician, leader of the party 1927–1932
- Thomas W. O'Connell, Assistant Secretary of Defense for Special Operations/Low Intensity Conflict & Interdependent Capabilities
- Tommy O'Connell (1930–2014), American football player and coach
- Tommy O'Connell (Kilkenny hurler) (1939–2019), Irish hurler
- Tommy O'Connell (Cork hurler) (born 2000), Irish hurler
- Tom O'Connell (television personality) (born 1990), contestant on Big Brother UK
- Tom O'Connell (cricketer) (born 2000), Australian cricketer
