= William Morse =

William Morse may refer to:

- William Morse (Medal of Honor), United States Navy sailor and Medal of Honor recipient
- William Morse (British politician), member of parliament for Bridgwater
- William M. Morse, American surveyor and politician in Wisconsin
- William P. Morse, United States Army officer
- William Reginald Morse, Canadian author, medical doctor, and medical missionary
