= USS Shenandoah (1862) =

Sloop-of-war of the United States Navy

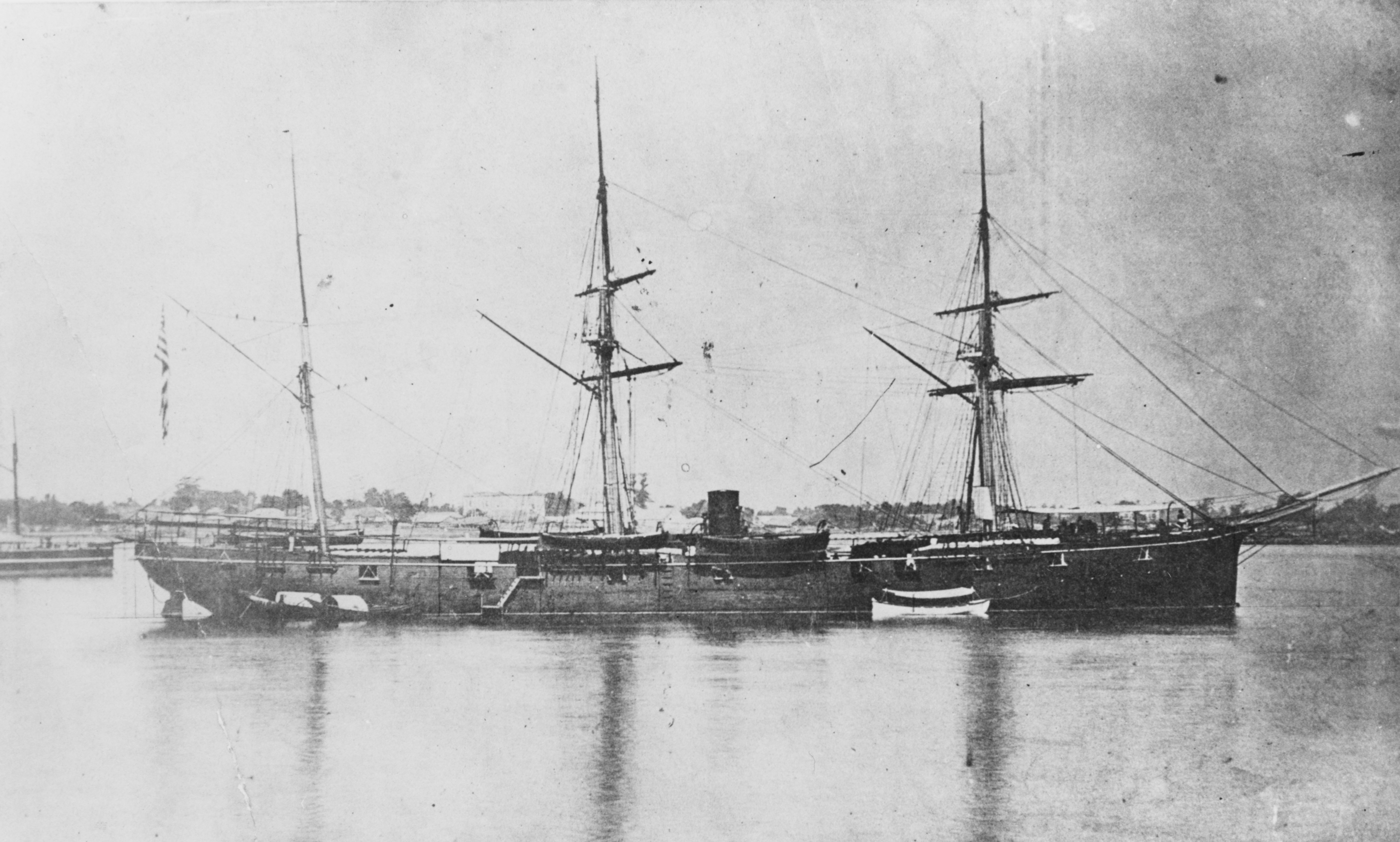
- Abeam view of Shenandoah between 1865 and 1869

History

United States
- Name: USS Shenandoah
- Namesake: Shenandoah River
- Launched: 8 December 1862
- Commissioned: 20 June 1863
- Decommissioned: 15 April 1865
- Recommissioned: 20 November 1865
- Decommissioned: 2 May 1869
- Recommissioned: 15 August 1870
- Decommissioned: 23 April 1874
- Recommissioned: 8 September 1879
- Decommissioned: 27 May 1882
- Recommissioned: 5 November 1883
- Decommissioned: 23 October 1886
- Fate: Sold 30 July 1887

General characteristics
- Type: Screw sloop
- Displacement: 1,375 long tons (1,397 t)
- Length: 225 ft (69 m)
- Beam: 38 ft 4 in (11.68 m)
- Draft: 15 ft 10 in (4.83 m)
- Propulsion: Steam engine
- Speed: 15 knots (28 km/h; 17 mph)
- Complement: 175 officers and enlisted
- Armament: 1 × 150-pounder Parrott rifle; 2 × 11 in (280 mm) Dahlgren smoothbore; 1 × 30-pounder Parrott rifle; 2 × 24-pounder rifled howitzer; 2 × 12-pounder rifle; 2 × heavy 12-pounder smoothbore howitzer

The first USS Shenandoah was a wooden screw sloop of the United States Navy. She was in commission at various times between 1863 and 1886 and saw service in the American Civil War.

== Construction and commissioning ==
Shenandoah was built by the Philadelphia Navy Yard at Philadelphia, Pennsylvania, and launched on 8 December 1862, sponsored by Miss Selina Pascoe. Shenandoah was commissioned on 20 June 1863, Captain Daniel B. Ridgeley in command.

== Civil War duty, 1863–1865 ==
Shenandoah departed Philadelphia, Pennsylvania, on the 25th, keeping a sharp lookout for Confederate raider, CSS Tacony, as she made her trial run to Boston to fill out her complement. On 11 July, she sailed in search of Confederate raider, Florida, cruised off George's and Nantucket shoals, thence preceded toward Block Island and Cape Sable. She returned to Boston on 27 July and spent from 4 August to 8 September in the Philadelphia Navy Yard. On 12 September, she arrived off New Inlet, North Carolina, to join the North Atlantic Blockading Squadron.

Shenandoah spent the greater part of the next fifteen months patrolling off Wilmington, North Carolina and searching on the blockade runner routes between Nassau and Wilmington. This cruising took her as far as Key West, Florida, and to the Bahamas and Bermuda. During a four-hour chase on 30 July 1864, she fired heavily into Confederate blockade runner, Lilian, which escaped in the darkness to the safety of Cape Lookout shoals. At daylight of 7 August, blockade runner, Falcon, narrowly escaped Shenandoah and USS Santiago de Cuba by throwing cotton overboard to lighten load and then outsailing her pursuers in the direction of Cuba.

=== The Battle of Fort Fisher ===
Shenandoah reached Green Bay in the Bahamas on 13 December 1864 to investigate reports that Confederate privateers were being fitted out there to prey on Union commerce. Finding no trace of such activity, she hurried north to join the great Federal Fleet poised on the coast of North Carolina for the attack on Fort Fisher which protected Wilmington, North Carolina. On Christmas Eve, she closed to within 1,500 yards of the shore to bombard the works of Fort Fisher with all guns that could be brought to bear. In little more than an hour, the Confederate fort had been silenced, two of its magazines had been blown up, and the fort set afire in several places. The bombardment was kept up with good effect until after nightfall.

One shot from the Confederates carried away Shenandoah's stern ladder. She renewed the action with other ships of the fleet on Christmas morning to cover the landing of about 3,000 Army troops. Her deliberate and well directed fire silenced a four-gun battery to the west of Fort Fisher. She then turned her attention to a two-gun casemated battery. One shell from this battery fell a few yards short, and another passed over Shenandoah which retaliated by exploding a 150-pounder rifle shell near the top of the mound.

Nevertheless, the amphibious assault failed to capture the fort and the Union troops re-embarked during the night, save for about 1,000 soldiers who found themselves stranded on the beach by heavy surf. These were safely returned to their transports during the following two days as Shenandoah patrolled off New Inlet.

The amphibious assault on Fort Fisher was renewed on 13 January 1865. Shenandoah's boats assisted in the landing of about 8,000 Army troops under cover of a severe bombardment. The next day, she joined the fleet in a quick fire on the face of the works which lasted from 1300 till well after dark. That day, 1,600 sailors and 400 marines were detached from various ships to join the Army troops in the assault. Fifty-four sailors and fourteen marines under Lieutenant Smith W. Nichols, armed with cutlasses and revolvers, were landed from Shenandoah. The furious bombardment support continued until 1500 on 15 January 1865. By this time, the sailors and marines were entrenched within 200 yards of the fort and ready for the final assault. The ships now shifted their fire to the upper batteries as troops and sailors dashed toward the top of the parapet.

The advancing sailors and marines were swept by concentrated Confederate gunfire; but Army troops, who had gained the highest parapet to the rear, opened with a volley of musketry to save them. Now the fighting progressed through seventeen immense bomb-proof traverses until the Confederates were finally forced to the end of Federal Point. Finding themselves hopelessly surrounded, the Confederate remnants surrendered, and Fort Fisher fell to the largest amphibious operation in American history prior to World War II.

Shenandoah's landing force returned with six wounded and five missing in action. Lt. Nichols reported: "Each and all deserve the highest commendation for their coolness and courage under the most trying circumstances, and fully sustained the hard earned reputation of the American sailor..."

After Fort Fisher was captured, Shenandoah spent a few days carrying wounded men from transports to shore hospitals. She then joined in the final days of the Union siege of Charleston which fell on 17 February. She returned to the Philadelphia Navy Yard on 15 March and was decommissioned there on 15 April.

=== Officers of Shenandoah, Civil War ===
Captain, Daniel B. Ridgely
Lieutenant, Smith W. Nichols
Surgeon, James McMaster
Acting Assistant Paymaster, C. M. Guild
Acting Master, John S. Watson
Acting Master, W. H. Brice
Acting Master, Joseph A. Bullard
Ensign, Yates Sterling
Ensign, J. H. Sands
Acting Master's Mate, L. H. White

Acting Master's Mate, Thomas H. Wheeler
Acting Master's Mate, T. D. Wendell
Engineers: Acting Chief; Nelson Winans
Second Assistant, E. A. Magee
Acting Second Assistant, James S. Kelleper
Third Assistant, D. M. Fulmer
Third Assistant, F. W. Towner
Third Assistant, Wm. Bond
Boatswain, James H. Polly
Gunner, George Edmond

== Service in South America and Asia 1865–1869 ==
Shenandoah recommissioned at Philadelphia on 20 November 1865, Captain John R. Goldsborough in command. She put to sea on 8 December for the Azores. Thence, she sailed to Bahia and Rio de Janeiro, Brazil, for service with the South American Squadron. On 28 April 1866, she departed Rio de Janeiro to join the Asiatic Squadron. After rounding the Cape of Good Hope, she visited Bombay and Calcutta; then touched at Penang before arriving at Singapore on 31 December 1866. She next proceeded to Bangkok where she received a friendly greeting from the King of Siam and his ministers before sailing via Saigon for Japan. She arrived at Yokohama on 5 April 1867.

There, on the 27th, Shenandoah embarked General Robert B. Van Valkenburgh, U.S. Minister to Japan, for transport to Osaka where he landed on 1 May for an interview with the Tycoon. There he learned that the Japanese government proposed to open additional ports to foreign trade. His mission was completed by 20 May when he returned on board Shenandoah to return to Yokohama. The ship was then placed at General Van Valkenburgh's disposal, to assist him in examining the different ports most suitable for commercial purposes. She left Yokohama on 25 June and reached Hakodate on the 28th. The first salute that was ever fired there in honor of a foreign minister marked the occasion. The minister and officers of Shenandoah were received by the governor with cordial politeness.

On 12 July, Shenandoah entered the port of Niigata where similar courtesies were extended. Nahon was reached the following day. No American ship had ever before entered that harbor. On the 17th, Shenandoah visited Mikuni and also Tsurunga, where no foreign warship had ever previously anchored. On 20 July, she arrived at Miyadsu, the most beautiful of the bays visited. Commodore Goldsborough and officers under his command made surveys of most of these new harbors, and prepared sailing directions for their entrance.

Shenandoah was part of the naval force before the ports of Osaka and Hyōgo which were quietly opened to foreigners on 1 January 1868. The event was celebrated by American and British ships, their mastheads being dressed with the respective national flags and the Tycoon's flag at the main. Each ship simultaneously fired a salute of twenty-one guns, which the Japanese promptly returned.

On the morning of 11 January, Shenandoah sent her boats to assist in the search for Rear Admiral Henry H. Bell, Commander-in-Chief of the Asiatic Squadron, whose boat had capsized while attempting to cross the bar on the way into Osaka from flagship Hartford. The admiral was drowned along with his flag-lieutenant and ten of the boat's thirteen crewmen. Command of the Asiatic Squadron now devolved upon Commodore John R. Goldsborough, as senior officer, until the arrival of Rear Admiral Stephen C. Rowan. Commodore Goldsborough transferred his pennant from Shenandoah to Hartford on 31 January 1868.

=== Korea ===
Lieutenant Commander Chester Hartford took temporary command of Shenandoah until 22 February 1868 when Cdr. John C. Febiger assumed command at Shanghai. From there Shenandoah proceeded to Chefoo, China, where she received orders to sail for Korea to attempt to rescue the crew of the American schooner, General Sherman, which had been destroyed in the Ping Yang River some eighteen months previously. It had been rumored that some of the crew or passengers were alive and in captivity. Korea, at that time, sought to exclude all strangers or foreigners.

Shenandoah departed Chefoo on 7 April 1868 and arrived off Chodo Island, Korea, on 9 April. After proceeding around to the southeast side, she arrived at the mouth of the Ping Yang River on the 16th. Commodore Goldsborough concluded from the information gathered that none of the passengers and crew of General Sherman had survived. He succeeded, however, in making a survey of the Ping Yang River and its approaches and in securing other useful data on that part of the Korean coast where no previous surveys had been made.

On 18 May, Shenandoah departed the mouth of the Ping Yang River to join the Asiatic Squadron in visiting the principal commercial ports of China and Japan to counter difficulties that arose out of opposition to contact with foreigners. Certain ships of the squadron stationed themselves in areas where roving Chinese pirates had attacked the American merchantmen. They protected foreign settlements in Yokohama as well as in the newly opened ports of Osaka and Hyōgo. They continued their service until local authorities assured the American officers that foreigners would receive respectful and peaceful treatment. The Chinese Viceroy at Canton promised Commodore Goldsborough that he would issue a proclamation prohibiting fishing junks from carrying extra men, or arms, or munitions of war which might be used to prey upon American commerce.

After calling at Chefoo, Shanghai, Yokohama, and Hong Kong, Shenandoah departed the latter port on 10 November. She visited Batavia, Java (1 to 8 December); thence proceeded, via the Cape of Good Hope and the island of St. Helena, to Boston where she arrived on 25 April 1869. She decommissioned there on 2 May 1869.

== The European station 1870–1874 ==
Shenandoah was recommissioned at Boston on 15 August 1870, and sailed on 4 September for service on the European Station. After a call at Lisbon and station duty at Le Havre, she touched Southampton on her way to the Mediterranean to show the flag at such ports as Ville Franche, Toulon, Marseille, Genoa, Alexandria, and Naples. While at Ville Franche on 15 December 1871, Seaman Isaac Sapp jumped overboard and rescued a shipmate from drowning, for which he was awarded the Medal of Honor. On 1 June 1872, she set course north for Lisbon, Queenstown, Plymouth, and Southampton; thence proceeded to Lisbon, Cádiz, Algiers, Tunis, Malta, and Piraeus. In the last named port, Christmas Day of 1872, she was host to the King and Queen of Greece. The following months found her at such ports as Smyrna, Turkey; Syracuse, Sicily; Ville Franche, France; and Barcelona, Spain. She departed the Mediterranean on 12 December 1873 for Tangiers; thence proceeded, via Funchal, Madeira, and St. Thomas in the West Indies, to Florida. She arrived in Key West on 22 January 1874 and sailed on 4 April for New York where she decommissioned on 23 April 1874.

== The South Atlantic 1879–1882 ==
Shenandoah was recommissioned in the New York Navy Yard on 8 September 1879. On 4 October, she sailed for Brazil, and arrived at Rio de Janeiro on 1 December 1879 to serve as flagship of Rear Admiral Andrew Bryson who commanded the South Atlantic Squadron. She watched over American interests in that quarter while cruising between Rio de Janeiro, Brazil; Montevideo, Uruguay; and Buenos Aires, Argentina. While at Rio de Janeiro on 19 September 1880, Seamen William Morse and John Smith rescued a fellow sailor from drowning, for which they were later awarded the Medal of Honor. This duty terminated on 4 February 1882 when Shenandoah departed Montevideo on a homeward-bound cruise that included calls at Barbados in the West Indies, Cartagena, Colombia and Havana, Cuba. She arrived at New York on 29 April and was decommissioned in the New York Navy Yard on 27 May 1882.

== Final days 1883–1887 ==
Her last cruise took Shenandoah to the Pacific coasts of South and Central America. She was recommissioned at Boston on 5 November 1883 and sailed on 29 December for the Cape Verde Islands. Thence, she steamed via Montevideo and around Cape Horn to Valparaíso, Chile, where she arrived on 5 May 1884 – one day after the Treaty of Valparaíso marked Chile's victory in her war with Peru and Bolivia.

Shenandoah cruised among parts of Peru, Chile, and Ecuador protecting American interests until 6 April 1885 when she arrived off Panama as part of the Panama crisis of 1885. Her landing party protected American property there during revolt against the Colombian Government that resulted in insurgent occupation of Panama. Aspinwall, on the Atlantic side, was attacked by insurgents who also occupied the greater portion of the isthmus, blocking the transit of the railroad. Obliged by the treaty of 1846 to guarantee the neutrality of the isthmus as well as rights of sovereignty by Colombia, the United States took immediate action. A naval force of eight ships and 2,648 sailors and marines under Rear Admiral James Edward Jouett arrived at Aspinwall and protected that town while a landing expedition proceeded across the isthmus to reestablish free passage for trains.

On 24 May 1885, Shenandoah departed Panama for Callao, Peru. She continued to cruise for protection of the American mercantile marine and other interests for the next seventeen months. Besides showing the flag at the principal ports of Chile and Peru, she called from time to time at San Jose, Guatemala; Corinto, Nicaragua; Panama, and Acapulco, Mexico. She arrived in Santa Barbara, California, from the Mexican coast on 30 September 1886. After a visit to Monterey, she was decommissioned in the Mare Island Navy Yard on 23 October 1886. She was sold on 30 July 1887 to W. T. Garratt & Company, San Francisco, California.

== See also ==
- Union Navy
- List of sloops of war of the United States Navy
- Bibliography of early American naval history

== Bibliography ==
- Wyllie, Arthur (2007). The Union Navy. Lulu.com. p. 668. ISBN 978-1-4303-2117-0.
