= Isaac Sapp =

- Navy Medal of Honor
- Born: c. 1844; Philadelphia, Pennsylvania
- Died: August 18, 1913 (aged 68–69); Newport News, Virginia
- Burial place: Hampton National Cemetery
- Military career
- Allegiance: United States of America
- Branch: United States Navy
- Rank: Seaman
- Unit: USS Shenandoah
- Awards: Medal of Honor

Isaac (or Isaiah) B. Sapp (1840s – August 18, 1913) was a United States Navy sailor and a recipient of the United States military's highest decoration, the Medal of Honor.

== Biography ==
Born in 1844 at Philadelphia, Pennsylvania, Sapp later joined the Navy from that state. By December 15, 1871, he was serving as a seaman in the engineering department of the USS Shenandoah. On that day, while the Shenandoah was at Villefranche-sur-Mer, France, he jumped overboard and, with Midshipman Miller, rescued Seaman Charles Prince from drowning. For this action, he was awarded the Medal of Honor two months later, on February 8, 1872. His first name was misspelled as "Isacc" on the citation.

Sapp's official Medal of Honor citation reads:

On board the U.S.S. Shenandoah during the rescue of a shipmate at Villefranche, 15 December 1871. Jumping overboard, Sapp gallantly assisted in saving Charles Prince, seaman, from drowning.

Sapp died on August 18, 1913 (aged about 70) in Newport News, Virginia. He is buried in the Hampton National Cemetery in Hampton, Virginia.

== See also ==
- List of Medal of Honor recipients during peacetime
