= William A. Stanley =

- Born: 1831; Massachusetts
- Died: Unknown
- Military career
- Allegiance: United States
- Branch: United States Navy
- Rank: Shell Man
- Unit: USS Hartford
- Conflicts: American Civil War • Battle of Mobile Bay
- Awards: Medal of Honor

William A. Stanley (born 1831, date of death unknown) was a Union Navy sailor in the American Civil War and a recipient of the U.S. military's highest decoration, the Medal of Honor, for his actions at the Battle of Mobile Bay.

Born in 1831 in Massachusetts, Stanley was still living in that state when he joined the Navy. He served during the Civil War as a shell man on Admiral David Farragut's flagship, the USS Hartford. At the Battle of Mobile Bay on August 5, 1864, he was severely wounded by a Confederate artillery shell but remained at his post manning the ship's number 8 gun until unable to continue due to blood loss. For this action, he was awarded the Medal of Honor four months later on December 31, 1864, however his medal remained unclaimed as of 1898.

Stanley's official Medal of Honor citation reads:

Shell man on No. 8 on board the U.S.S. Hartford during successful actions against Fort Morgan, rebel gunboats and the ram Tennessee in Mobile Bay, on 5 August 1864. Although severely wounded when his ship sustained numerous hits under the enemy's terrific shellfire, Stanley continued to pass shell until forced by the loss of blood to go below.
