= John Handran =

- Born: June 29, 1852; Massachusetts, US
- Died: December 12, 1885 (aged 33); Gloucester, Massachusetts, US
- Burial place: Calvary Cemetery in Gloucester, Massachusetts
- Children: 3
- Military career
- Allegiance: United States of America
- Branch: United States Navy
- Rank: Seaman
- Unit: USS Franklin
- Awards: Medal of Honor

John Handran (1852-1885) was a United States Navy sailor and a recipient of the United States military's highest decoration, the Medal of Honor.

== Biography ==
Handran was born on Jun 29, 1852 in Newburyport, Massachusetts, US.

=== Career ===
In December 1873, Handran joined the Navy as a seaman. By January 9, 1876, he was serving as a Seaman on the USS Franklin. On that morning, while Franklin was at Lisbon, Portugal, Landsman Henry O. Neil fell from the ship's lower boom into the water and was swept away by a strong tidal current. Handran and another sailor, Ordinary Seaman Edward Maddin, jumped overboard and kept Neil afloat until a boat could be sent to their assistance. For this action, both Handran and Maddin were awarded the Medal of Honor a month later, on February 15. In his letter of recommendation, the ship's captain stated that Handran had "displayed the same sort of gallantry on several occasions."

Handran's official Medal of Honor citation reads:

For gallant conduct while serving on board the U.S.S. Franklin at Lisbon, Portugal, 9 January 1876. Jumping overboard, Handran rescued from drowning one of the crew of that vessel.

=== Death ===
Handran died on December 12, 1885, at age 33 in Gloucester, Massachusetts. He was lost at sea aboard the Schooner Cleopatra. He is buried at the Calvary Cemetery in Gloucester, Massachusetts.

== See also ==
- List of Medal of Honor recipients during peacetime
