= Edward Maddin =

- Born: May 15, 1852; Newfoundland
- Died: August 15, 1925; Hampton, Virginia, U.S.
- Burial place: Hampton National Cemetery
- Military career
- Allegiance: United States of America
- Branch: United States Navy
- Rank: Ordinary Seaman
- Unit: USS Franklin
- Awards: Medal of Honor

Edward Maddin (May 15, 1852 – August 15, 1925) was a United States Navy sailor and a recipient of the United States military's highest decoration, the Medal of Honor.

== Biography ==
Born on May 15, 1852, in Newfoundland, Maddin joined the Navy from Massachusetts. By January 9, 1876, he was serving as an ordinary seaman on the USS Franklin. On that morning, while Franklin was at Lisbon, Portugal, Landsman Henry O. Neil fell from the ship's lower boom into the water and was swept away by a strong tidal current. Maddin and another sailor, Seaman John Handran, jumped overboard and kept Neil afloat until a boat could be sent to their assistance. For this action, both Maddin and Handran were awarded the Medal of Honor a month later, on February 15.

Maddin's official Medal of Honor citation reads:

Serving on board the U.S.S. Franklin at Lisbon, Portugal, 9 January 1876. Displaying gallant conduct, Maddin jumped overboard and rescued one of the crew of that vessel from drowning.

== See also ==
- List of Medal of Honor recipients during peacetime
