= Bartholomew Diggins =

US Navy sailor and Medal of Honor recipient (1884–1917)

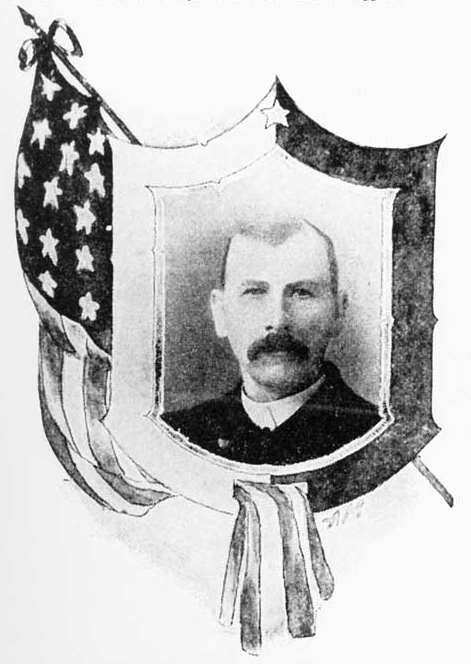
- Ordinary Seaman Bartholomew Diggins
- Born: October 9, 1844; County Kerry, Ireland
- Died: February 23, 1917 (aged 72); Washington, D.C., US
- Burial place: Arlington National Cemetery
- Military career
- Allegiance: United States of America
- Branch: United States Navy
- Rank: Ordinary Seaman
- Unit: USS Hartford
- Conflicts: Battle of Mobile Bay
- Awards: Medal of Honor

Bartholomew Diggins (October 9, 1844 – February 23, 1917) was a United States Navy sailor and a recipient of America's highest military decoration—the Medal of Honor—for actions in the American Civil War.

== Biography ==
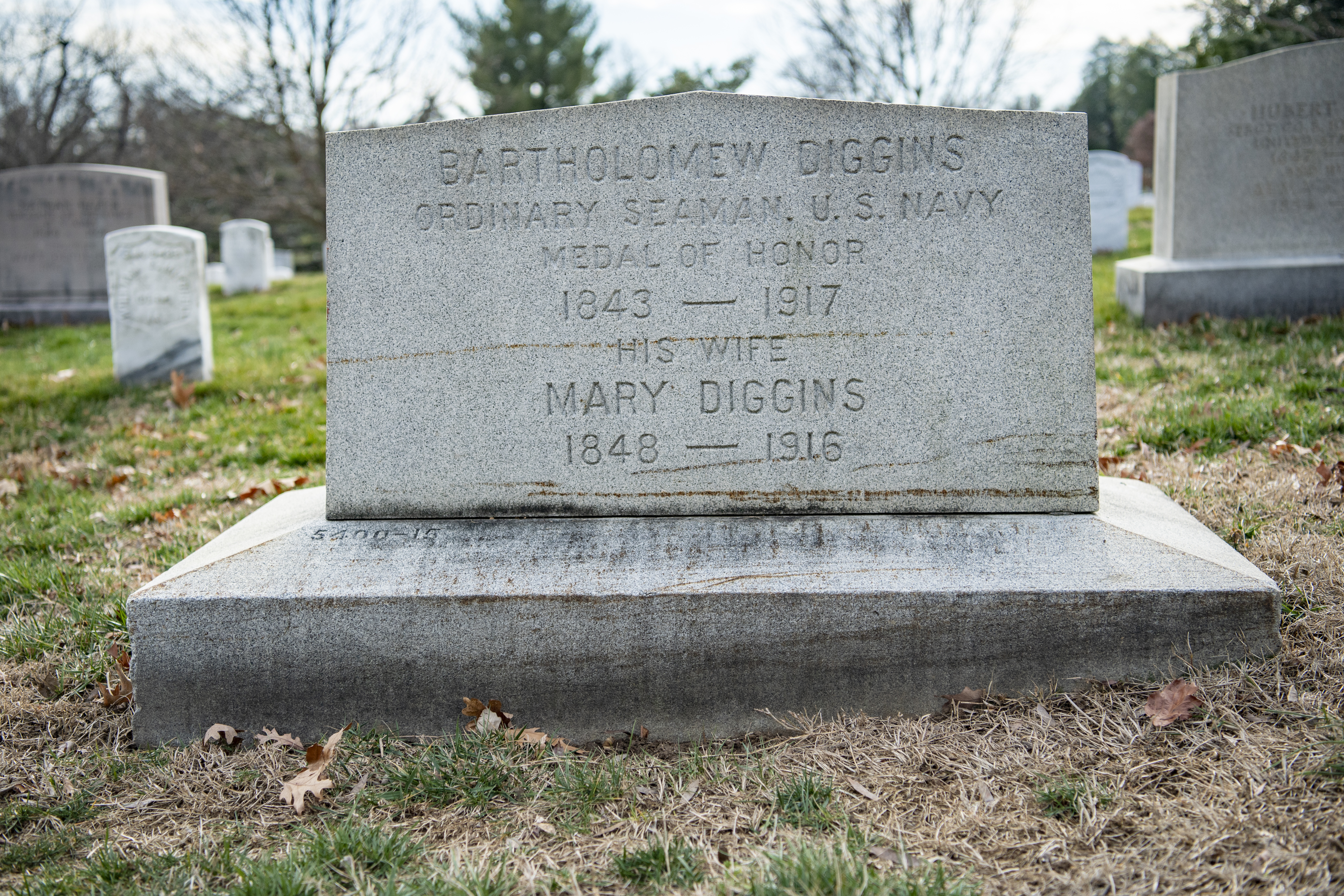
Grave at Arlington National Cemetery

Bartholomew Diggins was born in County Kerry Ireland. He entered the U.S. Navy from Maryland and served during the Civil War as an ordinary seaman on Rear Admiral David Farragut's flagship USS Hartford. Despite heavy gunfire at the Battle of Mobile Bay, Alabama, on August 5, 1864, Diggins continually loaded a gun during the two-hour battle which damaged batteries at Fort Morgan and ended with the surrender of CSS Tennessee (1863). He was awarded the Medal of Honor in recognition of his conduct during this action. Bartholomew Diggins died in Washington, D.C., and was buried at Arlington National Cemetery, in Arlington, Virginia.

== Medal of Honor citation ==
Citation:

On board the flagship, U.S.S. Hartford, during action against rebel forts and gunboats and with the ram Tennessee in Mobile Bay, 5 August 1864. Despite damage to his ship and the loss of several men on board as enemy fire raked her decks, DIGGINS, as loader of a gun, remained steadfast as his post throughout the furious 2-hour battle which resulted in the surrender of the rebel ram Tennessee and in the damaging and destruction of batteries at Fort Morgan.

== See also ==
- List of American Civil War Medal of Honor recipients: A–F
