= Harry J. Mandy =

- Born: June 2, 1840; England
- Died: August 14, 1904 (aged 64)
- Burial place: Hampton National Cemetery, Hampton, Virginia
- Military career
- Allegiance: United States
- Branch: United States Army
- Service years: 1862 - 1865
- Rank: First Lieutenant
- Units: (New York (state)) Company B, 4th New York Provisional Cavalry Regiment
- Conflicts: American Civil War
- Awards: Medal of Honor

Henry J. Mandy (June 2, 1840 – August 14, 1904) was a soldier in the United States Army and a Medal of Honor recipient for his role in the American Civil War.

Mandy enlisted in the Army from New York City in September 1862, and was assigned to the 4th New York Cavalry. Following his MOH action, he was commissioned as an officer. He transferred to the 9th New York Cavalry in February 1865, and mustered out with his regiment in July 1865.

He is buried in Hampton National Cemetery, Hampton, Virginia. His grave can be found in the Pheobus Section B-8709.

== Medal of Honor citation ==
Rank and organization: First Sergeant, Company B, 4th New York Cavalry. Place and date: At Front Royal, Va., August 15, 1864. Entered service at: New York, N.Y. Birth: England. Date of issue: August 26, 1864.

Citation:

Capture of flag of 3d Virginia Infantry (C.S.A.).

== See also ==
- List of Medal of Honor recipients
- List of American Civil War Medal of Honor recipients: M–P
