= Thomas Fitzpatrick (American sailor) =

- Born: 1837; Canada
- Died: Unknown
- Military career
- Allegiance: United States
- Branch: United States Navy
- Service years: 1861 - 1864
- Rank: Coxswain
- Unit: (United States Navy) USS Hartford
- Conflicts: American Civil War • Battle of Mobile Bay
- Awards: Medal of Honor

Thomas Fitzpatrick (born 1837, date of death unknown) was a Union Navy sailor in the American Civil War and a recipient of the U.S. military's highest decoration, the Medal of Honor, for his actions at the Battle of Mobile Bay.

Born in 1837 in Canada, Fitzpatrick, joined the US Navy from Taunton, Massachusetts in December 1861. He served during the Civil War as a coxswain on Admiral David Farragut's flagship, the USS Hartford. Acting as a gun captain at the Battle of Mobile Bay on August 5, 1864, Fitzpatrick was wounded in the face by splinters and his artillery piece was disabled by hostile fire. Within minutes, he returned the gun to operation by making necessary repairs and clearing away the dead and wounded. For this action, he was awarded the Medal of Honor four months later on December 31, 1864. Fitzpatrick had been discharged earlier that same month.

Fitzpatrick's official Medal of Honor citation reads:

The President of the United States of America, in the name of Congress, takes pleasure in presenting the Medal of Honor to Coxswain Thomas Fitzpatrick, United States Navy, for extraordinary heroism in action, serving as Captain of the No. 1 gun on board the flagship U.S.S. Hartford, during action against rebel gunboats, the ram Tennessee and Fort Morgan in Mobile Bay, Alabama, 5 August 1864. Although struck several times in the face by splinters, and with his gun disabled when a shell burst between the two forward 9-inch guns, killing and wounding 15 men, Coxswain Fitzpatrick, within a few minutes, had the gun in working order again with new track, breeching and side tackle, had sent the wounded below, cleared the area of other casualties, and was fighting his gun as before. He served as an inspiration to the members of his crew and contributed to the success of the action in which the Tennessee was captured.
