= Richard Ryan (Medal of Honor) =

- Born: c. 1851; Connecticut
- Died: December 16, 1933; Staten Island, New York, US
- Burial place: Waterbury, Connecticut, US
- Military career
- Allegiance: United States
- Branch: United States Navy
- Rank: Ordinary Seaman
- Unit: USS Hartford
- Awards: Medal of Honor

Richard Ryan (c. 1851 – 1933) was a United States Navy sailor and a recipient of the United States military's highest decoration, the Medal of Honor.

== Biography ==
Born in about 1851 in Waterbury, Connecticut, Ryan joined the Navy from that state. By March 4, 1876, he was serving as an ordinary seaman on the USS Hartford. On that morning, while Hartford was at Norfolk, Virginia, Landsman James Mullen fell from a gun port into the water. Mullen, who could not swim, was being swept away by a strong tidal current. Ryan jumped overboard, swam to the drowning crewman, and kept him afloat until they were rescued by the ship's launch. For this action, he received the Medal of Honor weeks later, on March 23.

Ryan's official Medal of Honor citation reads:

Serving on board the U.S.S. Hartford, Ryan displayed gallant conduct in jumping overboard at Norfolk, Va., and rescuing from drowning one of the crew of that vessel, 4 March 1876.

Ryan died in 1933 at Sailors' Snug Harbor Hospital, Staten Island, New York, after being admitted on and off for over 30 years. He is buried in Old Saint Joseph's Cemetery in Waterbury, Connecticut.

== See also ==
- List of Medal of Honor recipients during peacetime
