= James R. Garrison =

- Born: June 22, 1838; Poughkeepsie, New York
- Died: April 19, 1908 (aged 69)
- Burial place: Hampton National Cemetery, Hampton, Virginia
- Military career
- Allegiance: United States
- Branch: United States Navy
- Rank: Coal Heaver
- Unit: (United States Navy) USS Hartford
- Conflicts: American Civil War • Battle of Mobile Bay
- Awards: Medal of Honor

James R. Garrison (June 22, 1838 – April 19, 1908) was a Union Navy sailor in the American Civil War and a recipient of the U.S. military's highest decoration, the Medal of Honor, for his actions at the Battle of Mobile Bay.

Born on June 22, 1838, in Poughkeepsie, New York, Garrison was still living in that state when he joined the Navy on December 17, 1861. He served during the Civil War as a coal heaver on Admiral David Farragut's flagship, the USS Hartford. At the Battle of Mobile Bay on August 5, 1864, he lost a toe to Confederate fire but continued his duties at the shell whip (a device used to lift ammunition up to the gun deck) until receiving a second, severe, wound. For this action, he was awarded the Medal of Honor four months later, on December 31, 1864.

Garrison's official Medal of Honor citation reads:

On board the flagship, U.S.S. Hartford, during successful engagements against Fort Morgan, rebel gunboats and the ram Tennessee in Mobile Bay, on 5 August 1864. When a shell struck his foot and severed one of his toes, Garrison remained at his station at the shell whip and, after crudely bandaging the wound, continued to perform his duties until severely wounded by another shellburst.

Garrison was discharged from the Navy on November 11, 1864 in Philadelphia on account of disability due to his wounds in combat. After discharge he was employed as a laborer.

In 1899 Garrison was admitted to the Southern Branch of the National Home for Disabled Volunteer Soldiers in Hampton, Virginia.

Garrison died on April 19, 1908, at age 69 and was buried at Hampton National Cemetery in Hampton, Virginia.
