= William Pelham (Medal of Honor) =

William R. Pelham
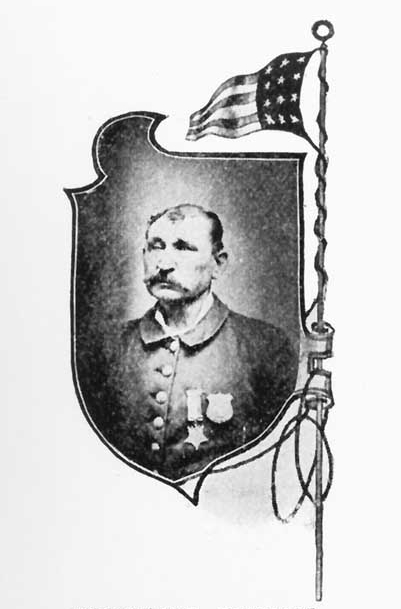
- Landsman William Pelham
- Born: December 24, 1845 or December 8, 1847; Parish of Tuosist, Kenmare, County Kerry, Ireland
- Died: March 30, 1933 (aged 85); Brooklyn, New York, US
- Burial place: Holy Cross Cemetery, Brooklyn
- Military career
- Allegiance: United States of America; Union
- Branch: United States Navy
- Rank: Landsman
- Unit: USS Hartford
- Conflicts: American Civil War Battle of Mobile Bay
- Awards: Medal of Honor

William R. Pelham (December 24, 1845, or December 8, 1847 – March 30, 1933) was a Union Navy sailor during the American Civil War and a recipient of the United States military's highest decoration—the Medal of Honor—for his actions at the Battle of Mobile Bay.

== Biography ==
Pelham enlisted in the Navy from New York City and took part in the Civil War as a Landsman on Rear Admiral David Farragut's flagship, the USS Hartford. On August 5, 1864, the Hartford participated in the Battle of Mobile Bay, Alabama. Five months after the battle, on December 31, 1864, Pelham was issued the Medal of Honor for his conduct in that action.

Pelham died at age 85 or 87 and was buried in Holy Cross Cemetery, Brooklyn, New York.

== Medal of Honor citation ==
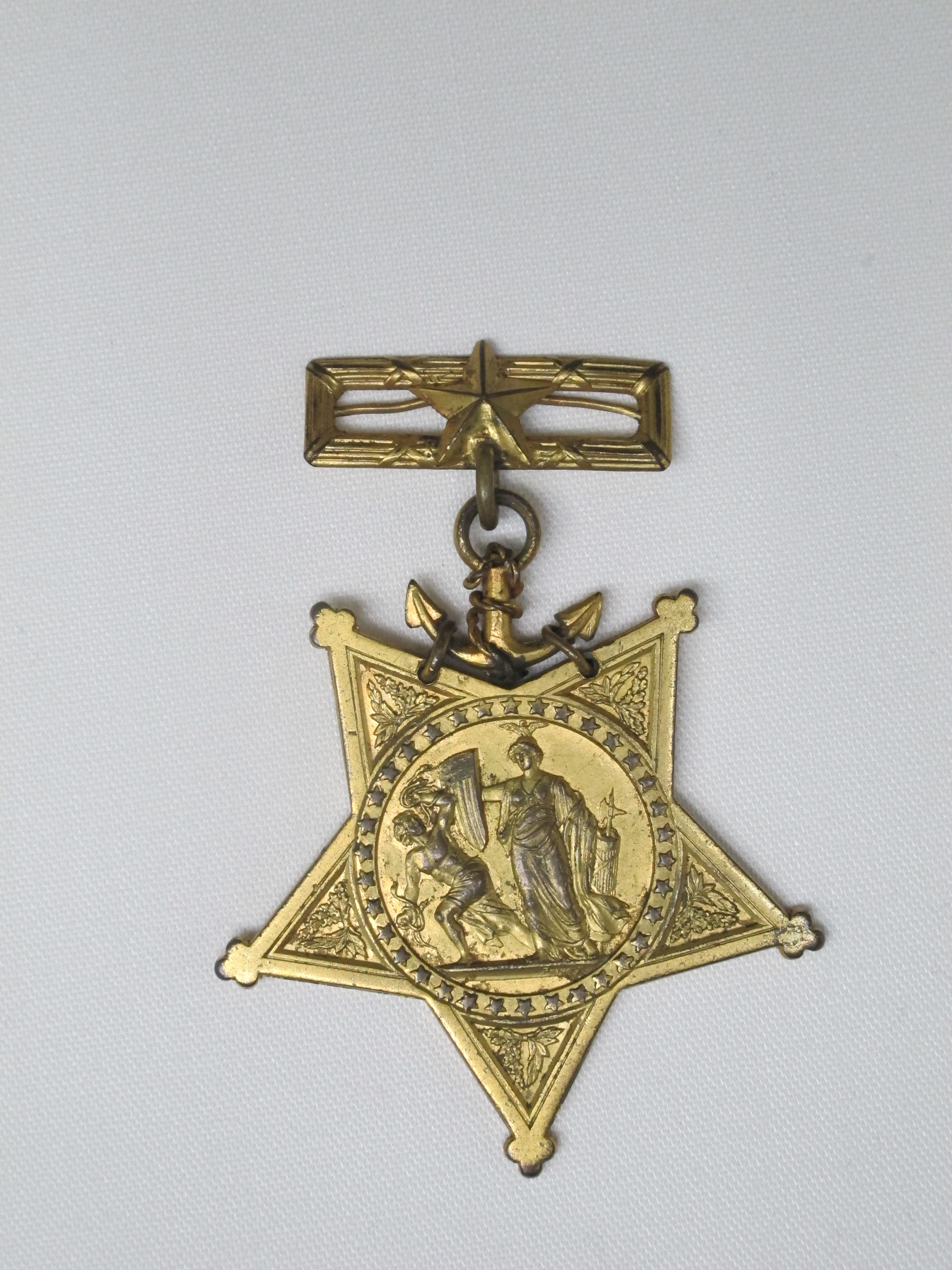
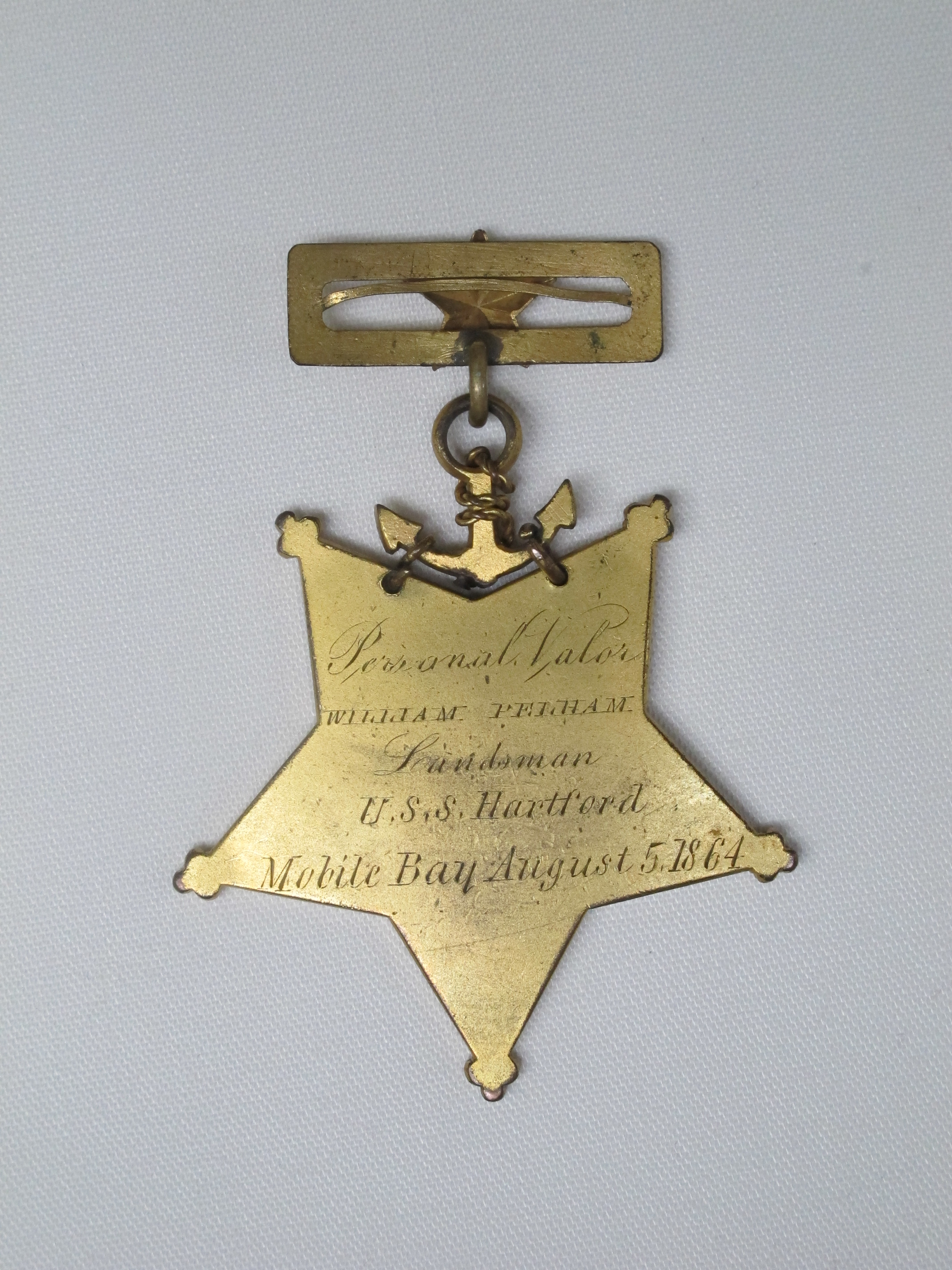
Pelham's Medal of Honor, front and back

Rank and Organization: Landsman, U.S. Navy. Born: Halifax, Nova Scotia. Enlisted in: Nova Scotia. G.O. No.: 45, December 31, 1864.

Citation:

On board the flagship U.S.S. Hartford during successful actions against Fort Morgan, rebel gunboats and the ram CSS Tennessee (1863) in Mobile Bay, 5 August 1864. When the other members of his guncrew were killed or wounded under the enemy's terrific shellfire, Pelham calmly assisted the casualties below and voluntarily returned and took his place at an adjoining gun where another man had been struck down. He continued to fight his gun throughout the remainder of the battle which resulted in the capture of the Tennessee.

== See also ==
- List of American Civil War Medal of Honor recipients: M–P
