= David Warren (Medal of Honor) =

American Union soldier during Civil War

David Warren (c. 1836 - August 2, 1900) was an American soldier and sailor awarded the Medal of Honor for his actions as a Coxswain on board the USS Monticello during the American Civil War. Warren was born in Glasgow, Scotland and is now buried in Hampton National Cemetery.

== Medal of Honor Citation ==
Served as coxswain on board USS Monticello during the reconnaissance of the harbor and water defenses of Wilmington, North Carolina, 23 to 25 June 1864. Taking part in a reconnaissance of enemy defenses which lasted 2 days and nights, Warren courageously carried out his duties during this action which resulted in the capture of a mail carrier and mail, the cutting of a telegraph wire, and the capture of a large group of prisoners. Although in immediate danger from the enemy, Warren showed gallantry and coolness throughout this action which resulted in the gaining of much vital information of the rebel defenses.
