= Charles Melville (Medal of Honor) =

Union Navy sailor in the American Civil War

- Born: James Ramsbottom c. 1828; Dover, New Hampshire
- Died: January 5, 1867 (aged 38–39)
- Burial place: Rochester, New Hampshire
- Military career
- Allegiance: United States
- Branch: United States Navy
- Rank: Ordinary Seaman
- Unit: (United States Navy) USS Hartford
- Conflicts: American Civil War • Battle of Mobile Bay
- Awards: Medal of Honor

Charles Melville (c. 1828 – January 5, 1867) was a Union Navy sailor in the American Civil War and a recipient of the U.S. military's highest decoration, the Medal of Honor, for his actions at the Battle of Mobile Bay.

Born in about 1828 in Dover, New Hampshire, Melville's birth name was James Ramsbottom. He joined the Navy from his hometown of Dover and served during the Civil War as an ordinary seaman on Admiral David Farragut's flagship, the USS Hartford. At the Battle of Mobile Bay on August 5, 1864, he was wounded by an artillery shell but returned to his post manning one of Hartford's guns for the remainder of the battle. For this action, he was awarded the Medal of Honor four months later, on December 31, 1864.

Melville's official Medal of Honor citation reads:

On board the flagship U.S.S. Hartford during action against rebel gunboats, the ram Tennessee, and Fort Morgan in Mobile Bay, 5 August 1864. Wounded and taken below to the surgeon when a shell burst between the two forward 9-inch guns, killing and wounding 15 men, Melville promptly returned to his gun on the deck and, although scarcely able to stand, refused to go below and continued to man his post throughout the remainder of the action resulting in the capture of the rebel ram Tennessee.

Melville died on January 5, 1867, at age 38 or 39 and was buried in Rochester, New Hampshire. His Medal of Honor is held by the National Museum of the United States Navy in Washington, D.C.
