= John Smith (Medal of Honor, born 1854) =

United States Navy sailor

- Born: 1854; Bermuda
- Died: Unknown
- Military career
- Allegiance: United States
- Branch: United States Navy
- Rank: Seaman
- Unit: USS Shenandoah
- Awards: Medal of Honor

John Smith (born 1854, date of death unknown) was a United States Navy sailor and a recipient of America's highest military decoration, the Medal of Honor.

Born in 1854 in Bermuda, Smith immigrated to the United States and joined the Navy from New York. By September 19, 1880, he was serving as a seaman on the USS Shenandoah. On that day, while Shenandoah was at Rio de Janeiro, Brazil, he and Seaman William Morse jumped overboard and rescued First Class Fireman James Grady from drowning. For this action, both Smith and Morse were awarded the Medal of Honor four years later, on October 18, 1884.

His official Medal of Honor citation reads:

For jumping overboard from the U.S.S. Shenandoah, at Rio de Janeiro, Brazil, 19 September 1880, and rescuing from drowning James Grady, first class fireman.

== See also ==
- List of Medal of Honor recipients during Peacetime
- List of African American Medal of Honor recipients
