= Ruppert L. Sargent =

Ruppert Leon Sargent
- Army Medal of Honor
- Born: January 6, 1938; Hampton, Virginia, US
- Died: March 15, 1967 (aged 29); Hậu Nghĩa Province, Republic of Vietnam
- Burial place: Hampton National Cemetery, Hampton, Virginia
- Military career
- Allegiance: United States of America
- Branch: United States Army
- Service years: 1966–1967
- Rank: First Lieutenant
- Units: 4th Battalion, 9th Infantry Regiment, 25th Infantry Division
- Conflicts: Vietnam War †
- Awards: Medal of Honor; Purple Heart

Ruppert Leon Sargent (January 6, 1938 – March 15, 1967) was a United States Army officer and a recipient of America's highest military decoration—the Medal of Honor—for his actions in the Vietnam War.

== Life ==
Ruppert L. Sargent was a graduate of Virginia State University. He first enlisted in the Army from Richmond, Virginia during the late 1950s, served several years as an enlisted soldier before attending Officer Candidate School at Fort Benning. By March 15, 1967, he was serving as a First Lieutenant in Company B, 4th Battalion, 9th Infantry Regiment, 25th Infantry Division. On that day, while in Hậu Nghĩa Province in the Republic of Vietnam, Sargent threw himself on two enemy hand grenades, sacrificing himself but saving the lives of two men nearby.

== Burial and legacy ==
Ruppert Sargent, aged 29 at his death, was buried in Hampton National Cemetery, Hampton, Virginia.

The Ruppert L. Sargent Building in Hampton, Virginia houses the Hampton City Schools, Commissioner of the Revenue, Treasurer, Economic Development Department and Office of the Assessor of Real Estate. A statute of Sargent rests in the building's lobby. Veterans of Foreign Wars Post 3219 renamed the post in honor of Medal of Honor recipient, 1st LT Ruppert Leon Sargent, in April 2019. The VFW Post 3219 renamed the post to honor his gallantry and heroism. Ruppert Leon Sargent was born in the town of Phoebus, Virginia, and is a local hero and inspiration for all of Hampton's Veterans and VFW Auxiliary.

== Medal of Honor citation ==
Lieutenant Sargent's official Medal of Honor citation reads:

...For conspicuous gallantry and intrepidity in action at the risk of his life above and beyond the call of duty. While leading a platoon of Company B, 1st Lt. Sargent was investigating a reported Viet Cong meeting house and weapons cache. A tunnel entrance which 1st Lt. Sargent observed was booby trapped. He tried to destroy the booby trap and blow the cover from the tunnel using hand grenades, but this attempt was not successful. He and his demolition man moved in to destroy the booby trap and cover which flushed a Viet Cong soldier from the tunnel, who was immediately killed by the nearby platoon sergeant. 1st Lt. Sargent, the platoon sergeant, and a forward observer moved toward the tunnel entrance. As they approached, another Viet Cong emerged and threw 2 hand grenades that landed in the midst of the group. 1st Lt. Sargent fired 3 shots at the enemy then turned and unhesitatingly threw himself over the 2 grenades. He was mortally wounded, and his 2 companions were lightly wounded when the grenades exploded. By his courageous and selfless act of exceptional heroism, he saved the lives of the platoon sergeant and forward observer and prevented the injury or death of several other nearby comrades. 1st Lt. Sargent's actions were in keeping with the highest traditions of the military services and reflect great credit upon himself and the U.S. Army.

== See also ==
- List of Medal of Honor recipients
- List of Medal of Honor recipients for the Vietnam War
