= Richard D. Dunphy =

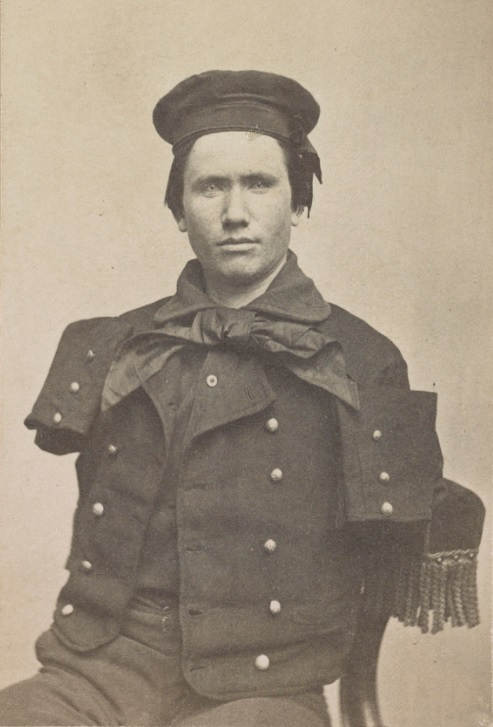
- Dunphy in 1864
- Born: December 12, 1841; Ireland
- Died: November 23, 1904 (aged 62); San Francisco, California
- Burial place: Saint Vincent's Cemetery; Vallejo, California
- Military career
- Allegiance: United States (Union)
- Branch: Union Navy
- Service years: 1863–1865
- Rank: Coal Heaver
- Unit: USS Hartford
- Conflicts: American Civil War • Battle of Mobile Bay
- Awards: Medal of Honor

Richard D. Dunphy (December 12, 1841 – November 23, 1904) was a Union Navy sailor in the American Civil War and a recipient of the U.S. military's highest decoration, the Medal of Honor, for his actions at the Battle of Mobile Bay.

== Military service ==
Born on December 12, 1841, in Ireland, Dunphy immigrated to the United States and was living in New York City when he joined the U.S. Navy on December 17, 1863. He served during the Civil War as a coal heaver on Admiral David Farragut's flagship, the USS Hartford. At the Battle of Mobile Bay on August 5, 1864, he "performed his duties with skill and courage" despite heavy fire. He was severely wounded by fragments of an artillery shell fired by the Confederate ironclad CSS Tennessee, losing both of his arms above the elbow. For his actions during the battle, he was approved for the Medal of Honor four months later, on December 31, 1864.

== Medal of Honor citation ==

Rank and organization: Coal Heaver, U.S. Navy. Accredited to: New York.

Dunphy's official Medal of Honor citation reads:

On board the flagship U.S.S. Hartford during successful attacks against Fort Morgan, rebel gunboats and the rebel ram Tennessee, Mobile Bay, 5 August 1864. With his ship under terrific enemy shellfire, Dunphy performed his duties with skill and courage throughout this fierce engagement which resulted in the capture of the rebel ram Tennessee.

== Post War life, death and burial ==
After his injury, Dunphy left the Navy and hired an aide to accompany him throughout the day and assist with such tasks as feeding himself. In 1866, he wrote a letter to Secretary of the Navy Gideon Welles explaining that he had never received his medal. He eventually moved to Wisconsin, married, and raised a family. The Wisconsin Legislature approved an extra pension for Dunphy in 1868 to help him support his family. Dunphy died on November 23, 1904, in San Francisco, California at age 62 and was buried in Saint Vincent's Cemetery, Vallejo, California.

Dunphy's obituary in the November 24, 1904 San Francisco Call newspaper read:

Old Naval Hero Dies. - Richard D. Dunphy, one of the naval heroes of the Civil War, passed away at his home in this city yesterday morning. Dunphy served in Admiral Farragut's fleet during the war and had both arms shot off during the battle of Mobile Bay. He was a native of Ireland and 62 years old.
