= USS Franklin (1864) =

United States Navy screw frigate

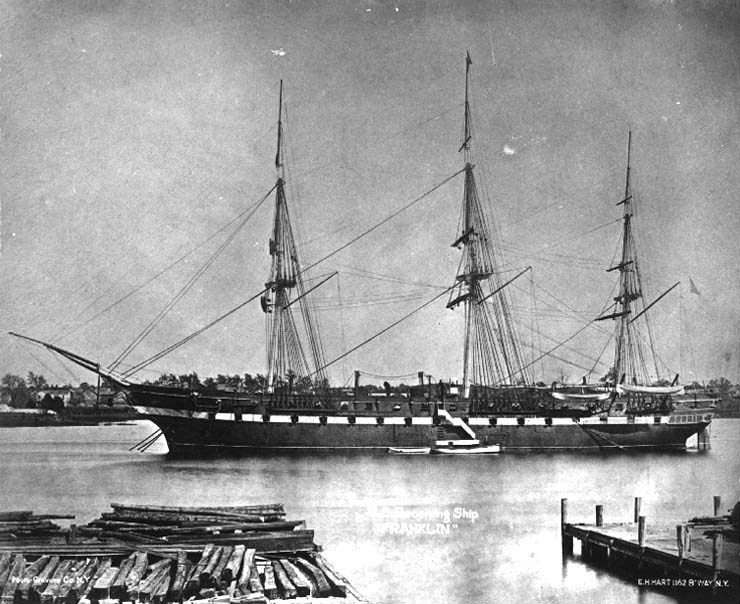
- USS Franklin, photographed by Edward H. Hart, ca. the 1880s.

History

United States
- Name: USS Franklin
- Namesake: Benjamin Franklin
- Builder: Portsmouth Navy Yard, Kittery, Maine
- Laid down: 1854
- Launched: 17 September 1864
- Commissioned: 3 June 1867
- Decommissioned: 13 November 1871
- Recommissioned: 15 December 1873
- Decommissioned: 2 March 1877
- Recommissioned: 2 March 1877 as receiving ship
- Decommissioned: 14 October 1915
- Stricken: 26 October 1915
- Fate: Sold

General characteristics
- Type: Screw frigate
- Displacement: 5,170 long tons (5,253 t)
- Length: 265 ft (81 m)
- Beam: 53 ft 7 in (16.33 m)
- Draft: 17 ft (5.2 m)
- Propulsion: Steam and sail
- Armament: 1 × 11 in (279 mm) gun; 34 × 9 in (229 mm) guns; 4 × 100-pounder (45 kg) guns

The fourth USS Franklin was a United States Navy screw frigate. The ship was launched in 1864, partially constructed from parts of the previous USS Franklin. Commissioned in 1867, Franklin, named after Founding Father Benjamin Franklin, served as the flagship of the European Squadron from 1867 to 1868 and from 1869 to 1871. She was decommissioned in 1871. Recommissioned in 1873, she joined the North Atlantic Squadron and served until 1877, when she was decommissioned again, then immediately recommissioned for use as a receiving ship at Norfolk, Virginia. She served in this capacity until 1915, when she was stricken and sold.

== Construction and commissioning ==
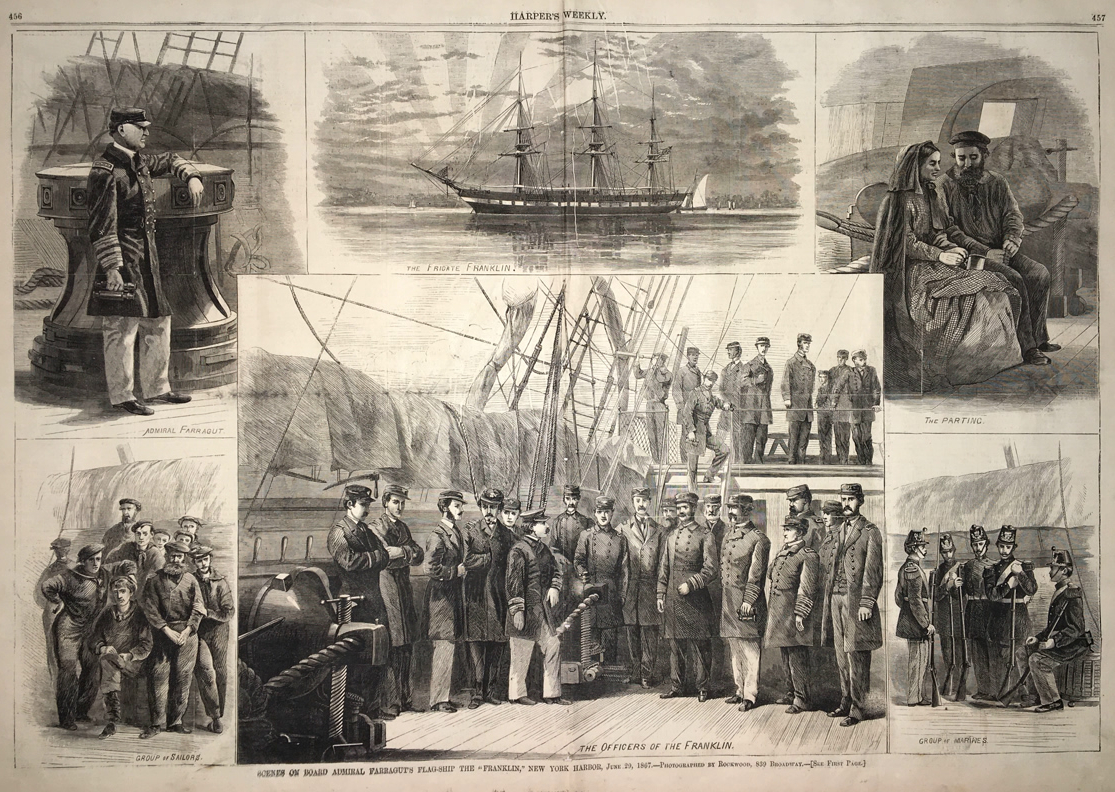
"Scenes on Board Admiral Farragut's Flag Ship The Franklin, New York Harbor, June 29, 1867." Harper's Weekly, from photographs by George G. Rockwood.

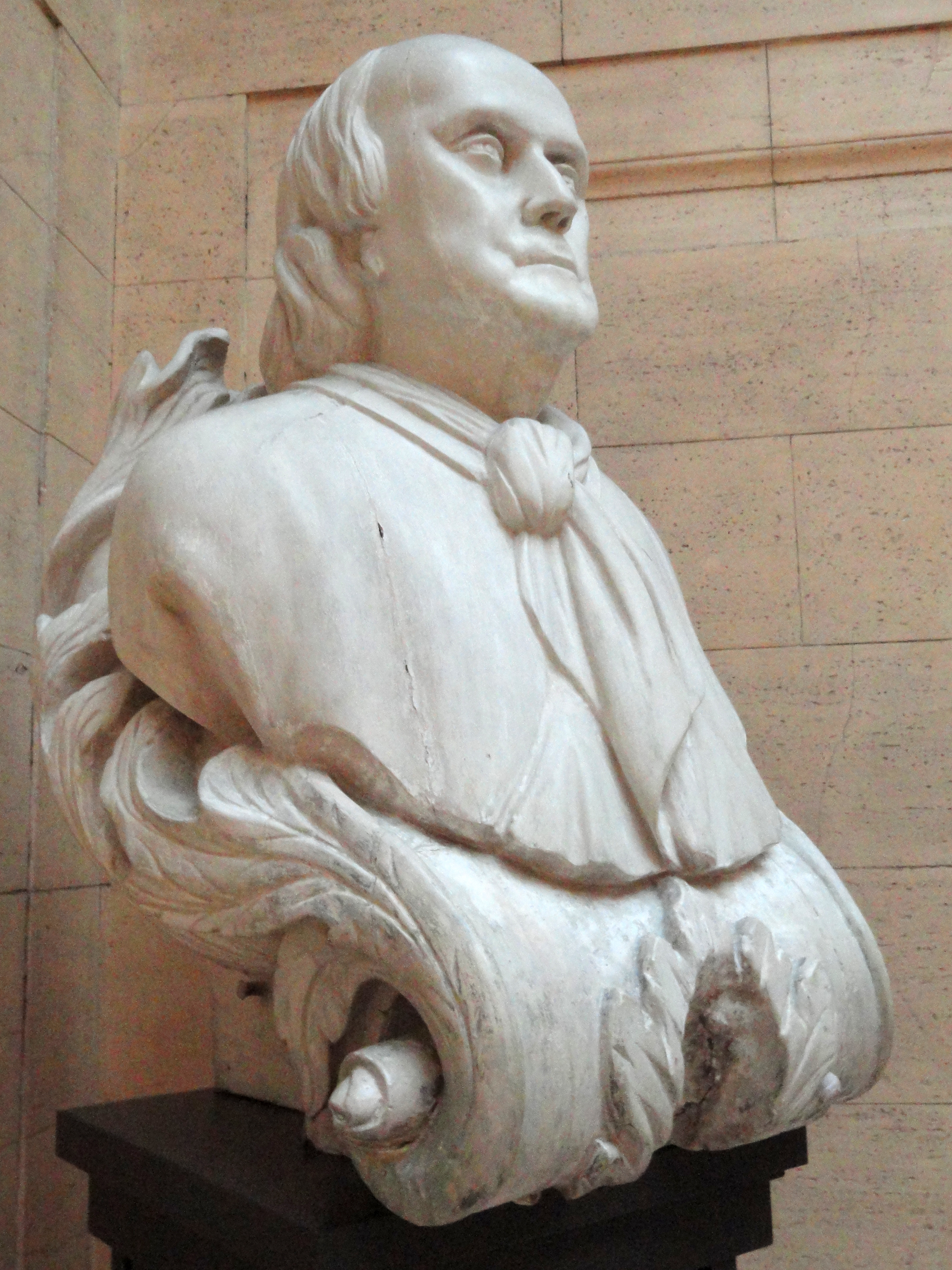
USS Franklin figurehead, c. 1853, by Woodbury Gerrish

Franklin was laid down at the Portsmouth Navy Yard in Kittery, Maine, in 1854, and built in part of materials salvaged from the previous USS Franklin, a ship-of-the-line scrapped in 1852. Prior to her launching, Woodbury Gerrish was commissioned to build a figurehead for her. For a time housed over, Franklin was launched on 17 September 1864 and commissioned on 3 June 1867 at Boston, Massachusetts.

== Service history ==
On 28 June 1867, Franklin departed New York City as flagship of Admiral David Glasgow Farragut, who assumed command of the European Squadron. Relieved by the sloop-of-war USS Ticonderoga, she arrived back in New York on 10 November 1868. Franklin's second tour in the European Squadron, beginning on 28 January 1869, was as flagship for Rear Admiral William Radford. She served with the squadron until 30 September 1871 when she sailed for the United States. On 13 November 1871 she was decommissioned at Boston.

Recommissioned on 15 December 1873, Franklin operated in the North Atlantic Squadron. On 11 April 1874, she stood out to sea to join the European Squadron as flagship until 14 September 1876. On 9 January 1876, while Franklin was at Lisbon, Portugal, Ordinary Seaman Edward Maddin and Seaman John Handran jumped overboard and rescued a shipmate from drowning, for which they were later awarded the Medal of Honor. In the aftermath of the Salonika Incident in May 1876, the U.S. Ambassador, Horace Maynard, requested that Franklin steam to the Aegean Sea to protect U.S. interests and citizens. Later that year, Franklin transported the corrupt politician William M. "Boss" Tweed — arrested in Spain after escaping from Ludlow Street Jail in New York City — from Spain to New York City, where she arrived on 23 November 1876.

Franklin was placed out of commission at Norfolk, Virginia, on 2 March 1877 and recommissioned the same day as receiving ship for Naval Station Norfolk. On 21 October 1907 her cutter, Cutter No. 2, with a launch lashed to its starboard side, was in a collision with a barge under tow by the tow steamer Pioneer at Norfolk resulting in the capsizing of the cutter and launch. The cutter sank and one occupant of the launch drowned.

Franklin remained in service as a receiving ship at Norfolk until 14 October 1915, which marked her final decommissioning. She was stricken from the Naval Vessel Register on 26 October 1915 and sold.

== Commemoration ==
Following Franklin′s decommissioning, her figurehead was donated to the U.S. Naval Home in Philadelphia, Pennsylvania, in 1930. The Naval Home then passed it on in 1938 to the Franklin Institute in Philadelphia, where it is on display.

== See also ==
- List of steam frigates of the United States Navy
- Bibliography of American Civil War naval history
- Union Navy
- Confederate States Navy
