= Michael Cassidy (sailor) =

- Civil War era Navy Medal of Honor
- Born: c. 1837; Ireland
- Died: March 18, 1908 (aged 70–71); Hampton, Virginia
- Burial place: Hampton National Cemetery, Hampton, Virginia
- Military career
- Allegiance: United States
- Branch: United States Navy
- Rank: Landsman
- Unit: USS Lackawanna
- Conflicts: American Civil War • Battle of Mobile Bay
- Awards: Medal of Honor

Michael Cassidy (c. 1837 – March 18, 1908) was a Union Navy sailor in the American Civil War and a recipient of the U.S. military's highest decoration, the Medal of Honor, for his actions at the Battle of Mobile Bay.

Born in 1837 in Ireland, Cassidy immigrated to the United States and was living in New York when he joined the Navy. He served during the Civil War as a landsman on the USS Lackawanna. At the Battle of Mobile Bay on August 5, 1864, Lackawanna engaged the CSS Tennessee at close range and Cassidy distinguished himself as the sponger on a gun crew. For this action, he was awarded the Medal of Honor four months later, on December 31, 1864.

Cassidy's official Medal of Honor citation reads:

Served on board the U.S.S. Lackawanna during successful attacks against Fort Morgan, rebel gunboats and the ram Tennessee, in Mobile Bay, 5 August 1864. Displaying great coolness and exemplary behavior as first sponger of a gun, Cassidy, by his coolness under fire, received the applause of his officers and the guncrew throughout the action which resulted in the capture of the prize ram Tennessee and in the destruction of batteries at Fort Morgan.

Cassidy died on March 18, 1908, at age 70 or 71 and was buried at Hampton National Cemetery in Hampton, Virginia.
