= Hampton National Cemetery =

Cemetery in Hampton City, Virginia

- U.S. National Register of Historic Places
- Virginia Landmarks Register
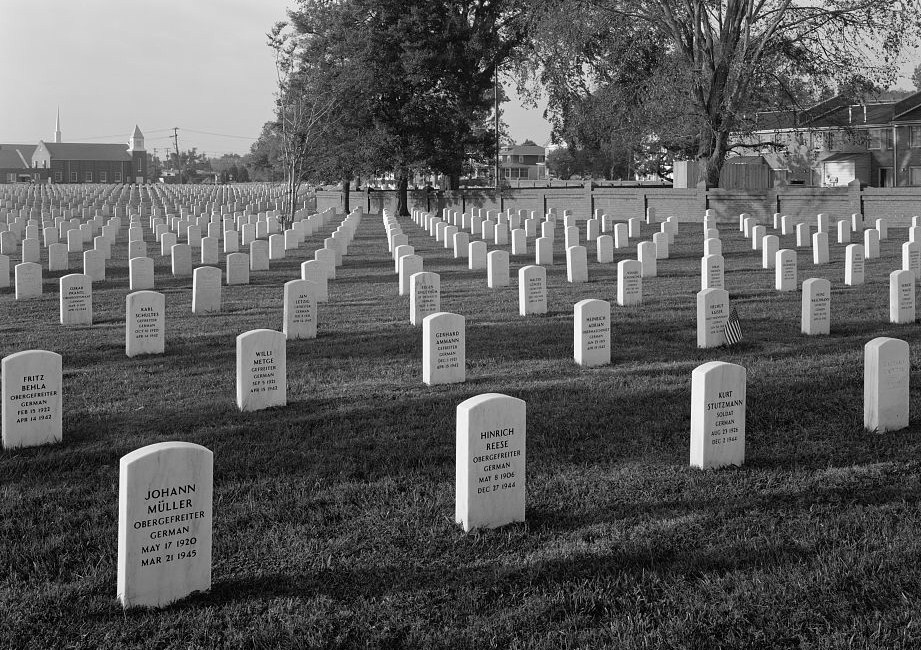
- Hampton National Cemetery

- Location within Virginia Location within the United States
- Location: Jct. of Cemetery Rd. and Marshall Ave., Hampton, Virginia
- Coordinates: 37°01′10″N 76°20′08″W
- Area: 27.1 acres (11.0 ha)
- Architectural style: Colonial Revival
- MPS: Civil War Era National Cemeteries MPS
- NRHP reference No.: 96000038
- VLR No.: 114-0148

Significant dates
- Added to NRHP: February 26, 1996
- Designated VLR: October 18, 1995

Hampton National Cemetery is a United States National Cemetery in the city of Hampton, Virginia. It encompasses 27.1 acres (11.0 ha), and as of 2014, had over 30,000 interments. There are two separate parts to this facility. The original cemetery is called the "Hampton Section" and is located on Cemetery Road in Hampton, VA. It is on the western side of I-64. The new section which is called the "Phoebus Addition" or the "Phoebus Section" West County Street in Hampton, VA east of I-64. It is less than a mile from the original cemetery. Both sections of the Hampton National Cemetery are closed to new interments.

== History ==
The first burials took place in the cemetery in 1862, and were primarily Union soldiers who died in service or at the hospital at Fort Monroe. It became a National Cemetery in 1866. While primarily for Union soldiers, it also has the interments of 272 Confederate soldiers in their own section.

Hampton National Cemetery has the interred remains of World War II prisoners of war, 55 German and 5 Italian. It also has the remains of 28 sailors from the German submarine U-85, which was sunk by USS Roper off Cape Hatteras in 1942. A British sailor from the same war is buried here.

Hampton National Cemetery was listed on the National Register of Historic Places on February 26, 1996.

== Notable monuments ==
- The Union Soldiers Monument, a 65' tall granite obelisk.

== Notable interments ==
- Medal of Honor recipients
  - Landsman Michael Cassidy (1837–1908), for action at the Battle of Mobile Bay, during the Civil War. Phoebus, Section B, Grave 9503.
  - Ordinary Seaman John Davis (1854–1903), for peacetime service aboard USS Trenton in 1881.
  - Coal Heaver James R. Garrison (1838–1908), for action at the Battle of Mobile Bay, during the Civil War. Phoebus, Section B, Grave 9523.
  - Sergeant Alfred B. Hilton (1842–1864), for action at the Battle of Chaffin's Farm, during the Civil War. Hampton, Section E, Grave 1231.
  - Ordinary Seaman Edward Maddin (1852–1925), for peacetime gallantry aboard the USS Franklin
  - First Sergeant Harry J. Mandy (1840–1904), for action at Front Royal, Virginia during the Civil War. Phoebus, Section C, Grave 8709.
  - Sergeant Isaac B. Sapp (1843–1913), for peacetime heroism in 1871. Section A, Grave 10465
  - First Lieutenant Ruppert L. Sargent (1938–1967 †), for action during the Vietnam War. Hampton Section F-I, Grave 7596.
  - Private Charles Veale (1838–1872), for action at the Battle of Chaffin's Farm, during the Civil War. Hampton, Section F, Grave 5097.
  - Coxswain David Warren, for action during the Civil War aboard USS Monticello. Phoebus, Section C, Grave 7972.
- Other notable interments
  - Peter Weckbecker (1864–1935), Major League Baseball catcher

== See also ==
- Hampton VAMC National Cemetery – a small cemetery on the grounds of the Hampton Veterans Affairs Medical Center
