= Hampton VAMC National Cemetery =

Part of the Hampton VA Medical Center

Hampton National Cemetery (VAMC)
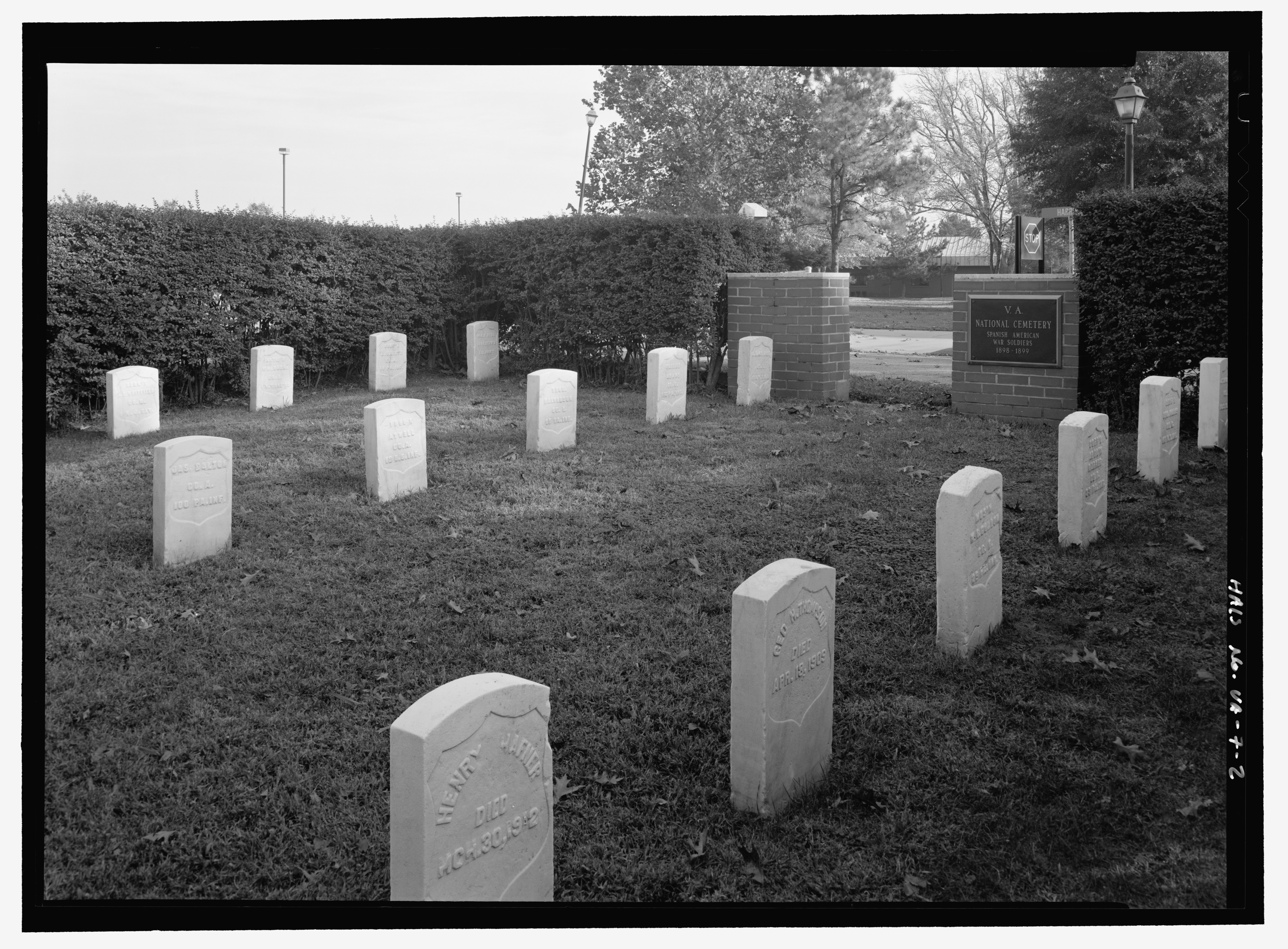

Details
- Established: 1898
- Location: Hampton VA Medical Center
- Coordinates: 37°01′07″N 76°19′52″W
- Type: Veterans
- Owned by: National Cemetery Administration; Hampton National Cemetery (management)
- Size: 0.2 of an acre
- No. of graves: 22
- Website: Official website
- Find a Grave: Hampton National Cemetery
- Footnotes: GNIS Data

Hampton Veterans Affairs Medical Center National Cemetery (Hampton VAMC National Cemetery) is a United States National Cemetery located in the city of Hampton, Virginia. It encompasses only 0.2 of an acre, and has 22 interments. It is currently closed to new interments.

== History ==
The Hampton VAMC National Cemetery is the smallest cemetery overseen by the Department of Veterans Affairs. It is located on the grounds of the Hampton Veterans Affairs Medical Center. It was established in 1898 at the Southern Branch of the National Home for Volunteer Soldiers during a strict quarantine for a yellow fever epidemic. Every man who died during the quarantine was buried on site, because no one was allowed to enter or leave the station. All burials took place between July 30 and August 15, 1899. Twenty-two were buried, most of them from New York and Pennsylvania.

Administration of the cemetery was transferred from the United States Army to the Department of Veterans Affairs in 1973. Hampton was one of 21 VA cemeteries on medical center grounds that were merged into the United States National Cemetery System.

== See also ==
- Hampton National Cemetery
- List of Veterans Affairs medical facilities
