= Thomas O'Connell (Medal of Honor) =

- Born: c. 1842; Ireland
- Died: 1899 (aged 56–57)
- Burial place: Windsor, Maine
- Military career
- Allegiance: United States
- Branch: United States Navy
- Rank: Coal Heaver
- Unit: (United States Navy) USS Hartford
- Conflicts: American Civil War • Battle of Mobile Bay
- Awards: Medal of Honor

Thomas O'Connell (c. 1842 – 29 August 1899) was a Union Navy sailor in the American Civil War and a recipient of the U.S. military's highest decoration, the Medal of Honor, for his actions at the Battle of Mobile Bay.

Born in about 1842 in Ireland, O'Connell immigrated to the United States and was living in New York when he joined the U.S. Navy. He served during the Civil War as a coal heaver on Admiral David Farragut's flagship, the USS Hartford. At the Battle of Mobile Bay on August 5, 1864, he manned the shell whip (a device used to lift ammunition up to the gun deck) despite being ill, until losing his right hand to a Confederate artillery shell. For this action, he was awarded the Medal of Honor four months later, on December 31, 1864.

O'Connell's official Medal of Honor citation reads:

On board the flagship U.S.S. Hartford, during successful attacks against Fort Morgan, rebel gunboats and the ram Tennessee in Mobile Bay on 5 August 1864. Although a patient in the sick bay, O'Connell voluntarily reported at his station at the shell whip and continued to perform his duties with zeal and courage until his right hand was severed by an enemy shellburst.

O'Connell died on 24 August 1899 at age 56 or 57. His Medal of Honor is held by the National Museum of the United States Navy in Washington, D.C.
