= William Morse (Medal of Honor) =

United States Navy sailor

- Born: May 1852; Free and Hanseatic City of Hamburg
- Died: Unknown
- Military career
- Allegiance: United States
- Branch: United States Navy
- Rank: Seaman
- Unit: USS Shenandoah
- Awards: Medal of Honor

William Morse (born May 1852, date of death unknown) was a United States Navy sailor and a recipient of the United States military's highest decoration, the Medal of Honor.

== Biography ==
Born in May 1852 in the Free and Hanseatic City of Hamburg, Morse immigrated to the United States and joined the Navy from New York. By September 19, 1880, he was serving as a seaman on the USS Shenandoah. On that day, while Shenandoah was at Rio de Janeiro, Brazil, he and Seaman John Smith jumped overboard and rescued First Class Fireman James Grady from drowning. For this action, both Morse and Smith were awarded the Medal of Honor four years later, on October 18, 1884.

Morse's official Medal of Honor citation reads:

or jumping overboard from the U.S.S. Shenandoah at Rio de Janeiro Brazil, 19 September 1880, and rescuing from drowning James Grady, first class fireman.

== See also ==
- List of Medal of Honor recipients in non-combat incidents
