= USS Hartford (1858) =

Gunboat of the United States Navy

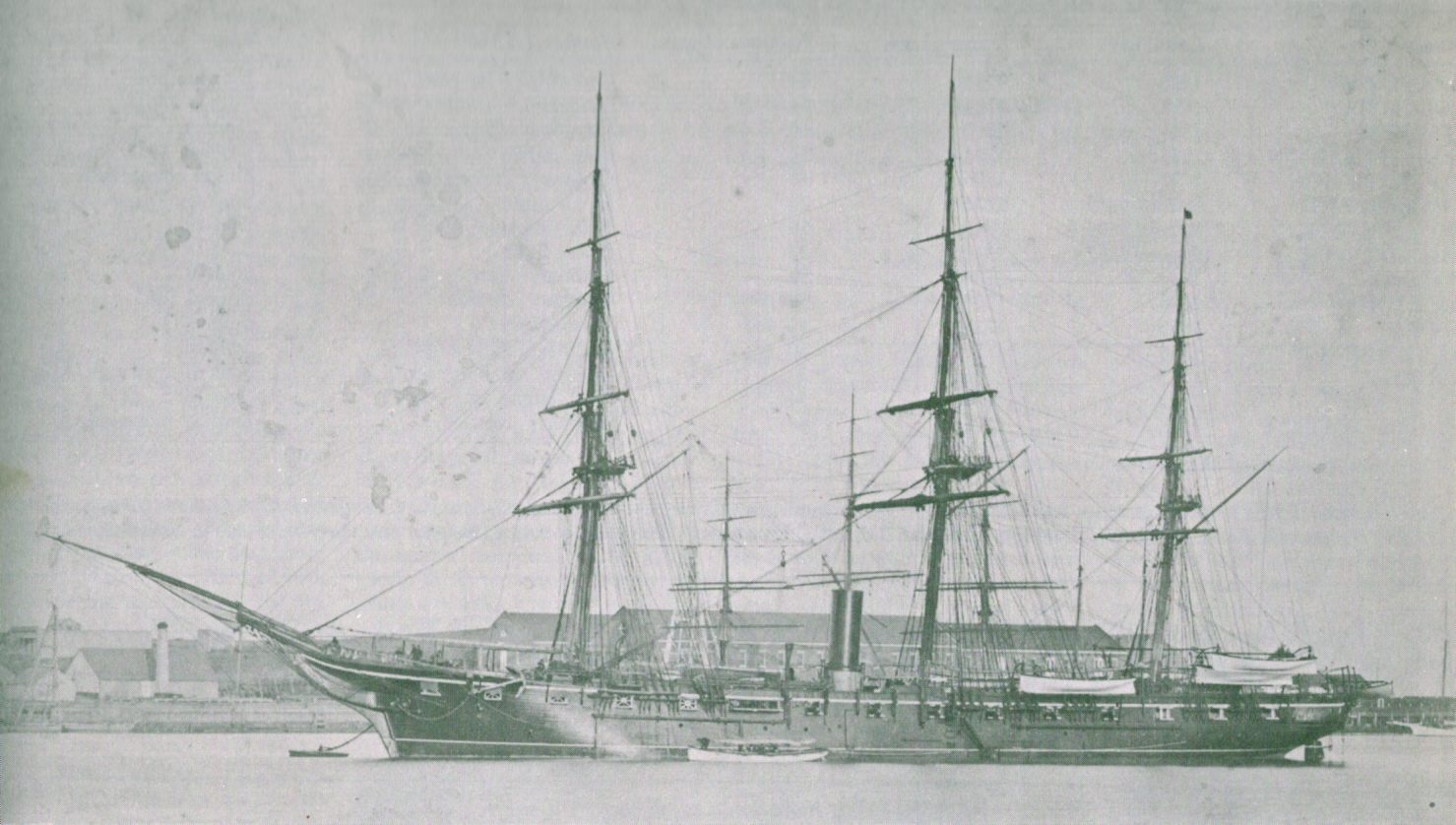
- USS Hartford at Mare Island Navy Yard, Vallejo, California.

History

United States
- Name: USS Hartford
- Builder: Boston Navy Yard
- Launched: 22 November 1858
- Commissioned: 27 May 1859
- Decommissioned: 20 August 1926
- Fate: Sank at her berth, 20 November 1956, subsequently dismantled

General characteristics
- Type: Sloop-of-war
- Tonnage: 2900
- Length: 225 ft (69 m)
- Beam: 44 ft (13 m)
- Draft: 17 ft 2 in (5.23 m)
- Propulsion: Steam engine and Sails
- Speed: 13.5 knots (25.0 km/h; 15.5 mph)
- Complement: 310 officers and enlisted
- Armament: 20 × 9 in (230 mm) smoothbore Dahlgren guns; 1 × 20-pounder Parrott rifles; 2 × 12-pounder guns

USS Hartford, a sloop-of-war steamer, was the first ship of the United States Navy named for Hartford, the capital of Connecticut. Hartford served in several prominent campaigns in the American Civil War as the flagship of David G. Farragut, most notably the Battle of Mobile Bay in 1864. She survived until 1956, when she sank awaiting restoration at Norfolk, Virginia.

== Service history ==
=== East India Squadron, 1859–1861 ===
Hartford was launched on 22 November 1858 at the Boston Navy Yard; sponsored by Miss Carrie Downes, Miss Lizzie Stringham, and Lieutenant G. J. H. Preble; and commissioned on 27 May 1859, Captain Charles Lowndes in command. After shakedown out of Boston, the new screw sloop of war, carrying Flag Officer Cornelius K. Stribling, the newly appointed commander of the East India Squadron, sailed for the Cape of Good Hope and the Far East. Upon reaching the Orient, Hartford relieved Mississippi as flagship. In November, she embarked the American Minister to China, John Elliott Ward, at Hong Kong and carried him to Canton, Manila, Swatow, Shanghai, and other Far Eastern ports to settle American claims and to arrange for favorable consideration of the Nation's interests.

=== Civil War, 1861–1865 ===
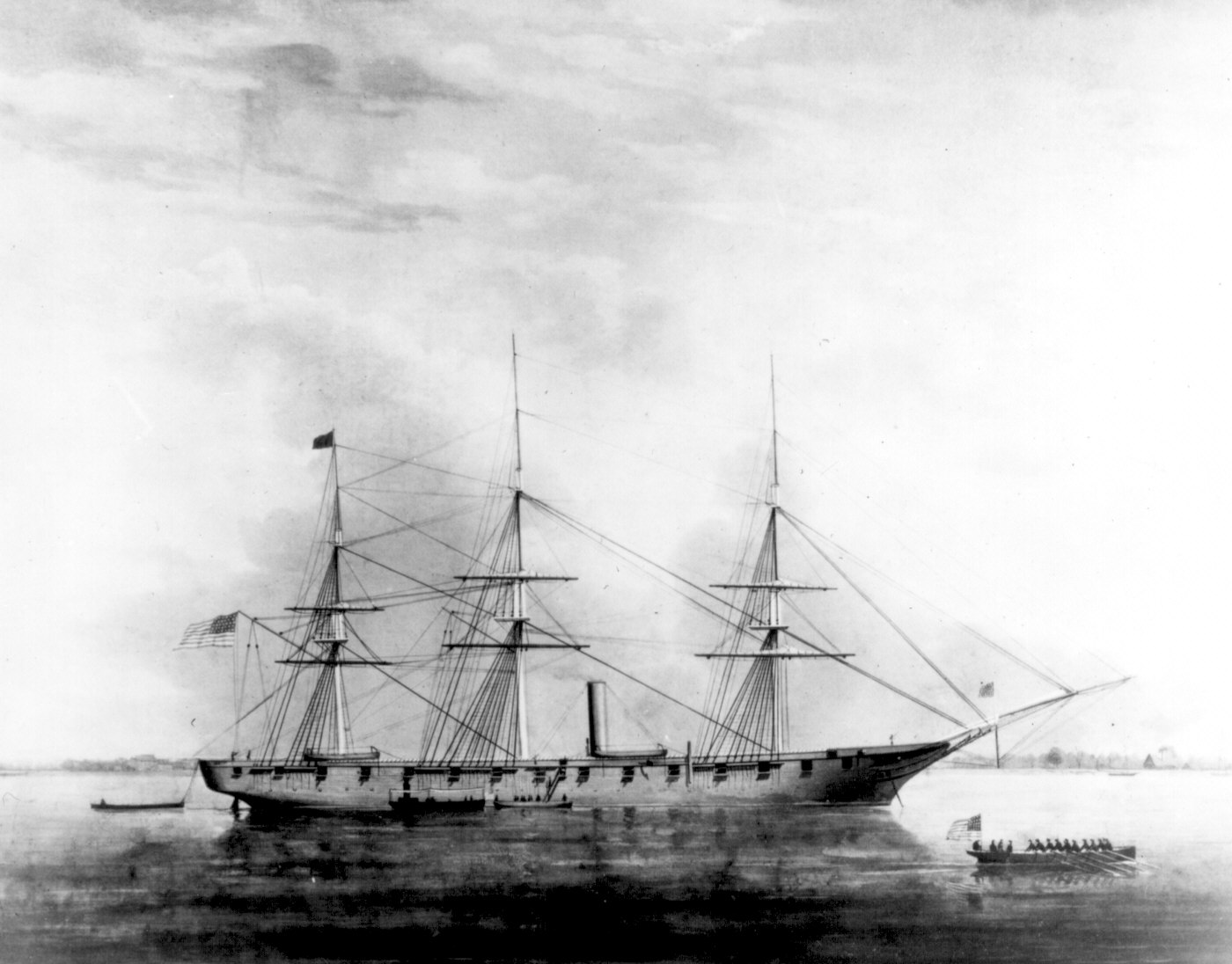
A painting of USS Hartford by E. Arnold.

With the outbreak of the American Civil War, Hartford was ordered home. She departed the Sunda Strait with Dacotah on 30 August 1861 and arrived Philadelphia on 2 December to be fitted out for wartime service. She departed the Delaware Capes on 28 January as flagship of Flag Officer David G. Farragut, the commander of the newly created West Gulf Blockading Squadron. (See also: Confederate blockade mail.)

An even larger purpose than the important blockade of the South's Gulf Coast lay behind Farragut's assignment. Late in 1861, the Union high command decided to capture New Orleans, the South's richest and most populous city, to begin a drive of sea-based power up the Mississippi River to meet the Union Army which was to drive down the Mississippi valley behind a spearhead of armored gunboats. "Other operations," Secretary of the Navy Gideon Welles warned Farragut, "must not be allowed to interfere with the great object in view—the certain capture of the city of New Orleans."

Hartford arrived 20 February at Ship Island, Mississippi, midway between Mobile Bay and the mouths of the Mississippi. Several Union ships and a few Army units were already in the vicinity when the squadron's flagship dropped anchor at the advanced staging area for the attack on New Orleans. In ensuing weeks a mighty fleet assembled for the campaign. In mid-March Commander David Dixon Porter's flotilla of mortar schooners arrived towed by steam gunboats.

The next task was to get Farragut's ships across the bar, a constantly shifting mud bank at the mouth of each pass entering the Mississippi. Farragut managed to get all of his ships but Colorado across the bar and into the river where Forts St. Philip and Jackson challenged further advance. A line of hulks connected by strong barrier chains, six ships of the Confederate Navy—including ironclad Manassas and unfinished but potentially deadly ironclad Louisiana, two ships of the Louisiana Navy, a group of converted river steamers called the Confederate River Defense Fleet, and a number of fire rafts also stood between Farragut and the great Southern metropolis.

On 16 April, the Union ships moved up the river to a position below the forts, and David Dixon Porter's gunboats first exchanged fire with the Southern guns. Two days later his mortar schooners opened a heavy barrage which continued for six days. On the 21st, the squadron's Fleet Captain, Henry H. Bell, led a daring expedition up river and, despite a tremendous fire on him, cut the chain across the river. In the early hours of 24 April, a red lantern on Hartford's mizzen peak signaled the fleet to get underway and steam through the breach in the obstructions. As the ships closed the forts their broadsides answered a fire from the Confederate guns. Porter's mortar schooners and gunboats remained at their stations below the southern fortifications covering the movement with rapid fire.

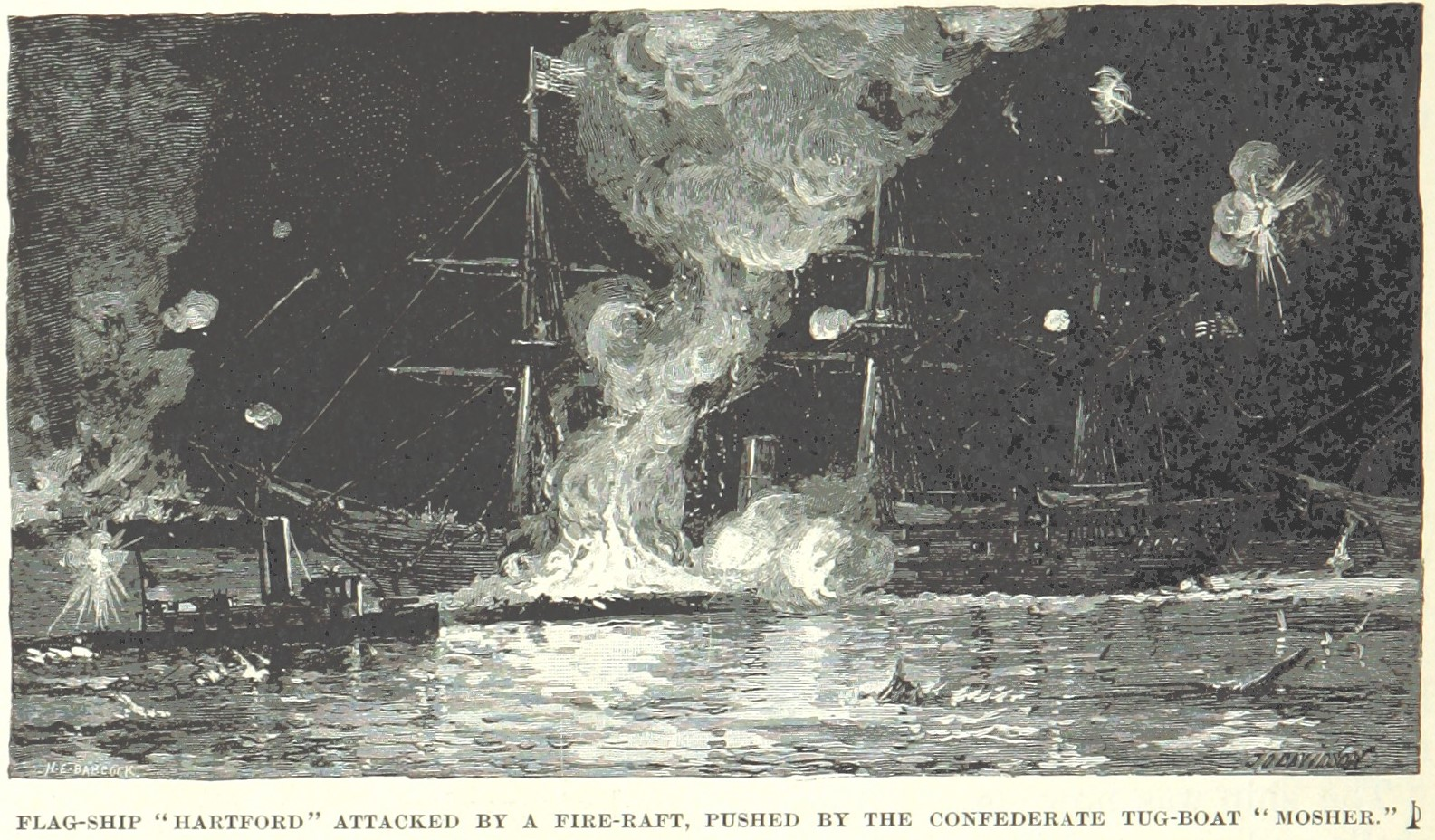
Hartford is attacked by a fire raft at the Battle of Forts Jackson and St. Philip

Hartford dodged a run by ironclad ram Manassas; then, while attempting to avoid a fireraft, grounded in the swift current near Fort St. Philip. When the burning barge was shoved alongside the flagship, only Farragut's leadership and the training of the crew saved Hartford from being destroyed by flames which at one point engulfed a large portion of the ship. Meanwhile, the sloop's gunners never slackened the pace at which they fired into the forts. As her firefighters snuffed out the flames, the flagship backed free of the bank.

When Farragut's ships had run the gantlet and passed out of range of the fort's guns, the Confederate River Defense Fleet attempted to stop their progress. In the ensuing melee, they managed to sink converted merchantman USS Varuna, the only Union ship lost during the night.

==== Battle of New Orleans, 1862 ====
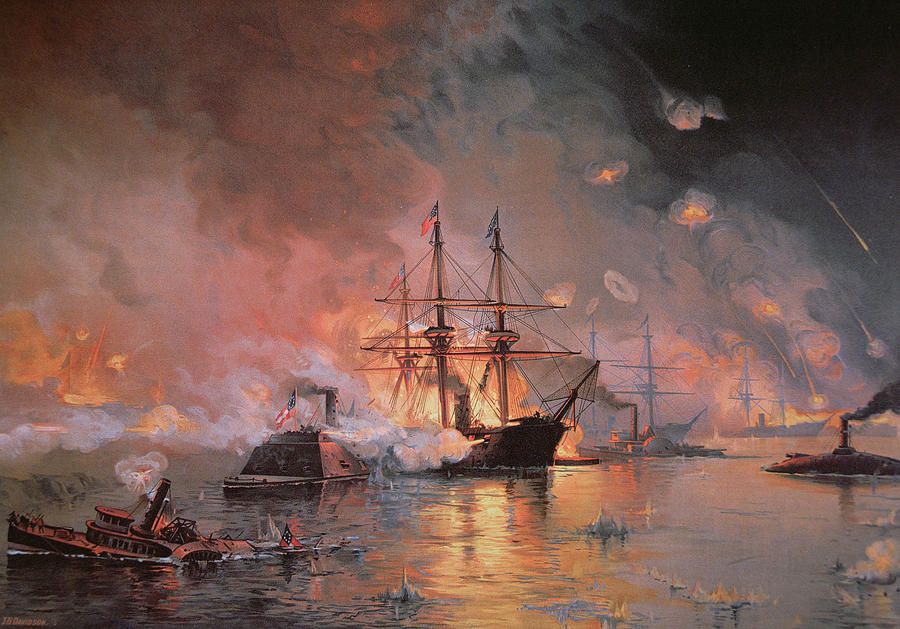
Farragut's flagship, USS Hartford, forces its way past Fort Jackson.

The next day, after silencing Confederate batteries, a few miles below New Orleans, Hartford and her sister ships anchored off the city early in the afternoon. A handful of ships and men had won a great decisive victory that secured the north, the mouth of the Mississippi river.

Early in May, Farragut ordered several of his ships up stream to clear the river and followed himself in Hartford on the 7th to join in the conquest of the valley. Defenseless, Baton Rouge and Natchez promptly surrendered to the Union ships and no significant opposition was encountered until 18 May when the Confederate commandant at Vicksburg replied to Commander Samuel P. Lee's demand for surrender: "... Mississippians don't know and refuse to learn, how to surrender to an enemy. If Commodore Farragut or Brigadier General Butler can teach them, let them come and try."

When Farragut arrived on the scene a few days later, he learned that heavy Southern guns mounted on the bluff at Vicksburg some 200 feet (61 m) above the river could shell his ships while his own guns could not be elevated enough to hit them back. Since sufficient troops were not available to take the fortress by storm, the Flag Officer headed downstream on 27 May leaving gunboats to blockade it from below.

Orders awaited Farragut at New Orleans, where he arrived on 30 May, directing him to open the river and join the Western Flotilla and stating that Abraham Lincoln himself had given the task highest priority. The Flag Officer recalled Porter's mortar schooners from Mobile, Alabama and got underway up the Mississippi in Hartford on 8 June.

==== Prelude to the Vicksburg Campaign, 1862–1863 ====
The Union Squadron was assembled just below Vicksburg by 26 June 1862. Two days later the Union ships, their own guns blazing at rapid fire and covered by an intense barrage from the mortars, suffered little damage while running past the batteries. Flag Officer Davis, commanding the Western Flotilla, joined Farragut above Vicksburg on the 30th; but again, naval efforts to take Vicksburg were frustrated by a lack of troops. "Ships," Porter commented, "... cannot crawl up hills 300 feet high, and it is that part of Vicksburg which must be taken by the Army." On 22 July, Farragut received orders to return down the river at his discretion and he got underway on 24 July, reached New Orleans in four days, and after a fortnight sailed to Pensacola, Florida, for repairs.

The flagship returned to New Orleans on 9 November to prepare for further operations in the unpredictable waters of the Mississippi. The Union Army, ably supported by the Mississippi Squadron, was pressing, on Vicksburg from above, and Farragut wanted to assist in the campaign by blockading the mouth of the Red River from which supplies were pouring eastward to the Confederate Army. Meanwhile, the South had been fortifying its defenses along the river and had erected powerful batteries at Port Hudson, Louisiana.

On the night of 14 March 1863, Farragut in Hartford and accompanied by six other ships, attempted to run by these batteries. However, they encountered such heavy and accurate fire that only the flagship and Albatross, lashed alongside, succeeded in running the gauntlet. Thereafter, Hartford and her consort patrolled between Port Hudson and Vicksburg denying the Confederacy desperately needed supplies from the West.

Porter's Mississippi Squadron, cloaked by night, dashed downstream past the Vicksburg batteries on 16 April, while General Ulysses S. Grant marched his troops overland to a new base also below the Southern stronghold. April closed with the Navy ferrying Grant's troops across the river to Bruinsburg whence they encircled Vicksburg and forced the beleaguered fortress to surrender on 4 July.

==== Battle of Mobile Bay, 1864 ====
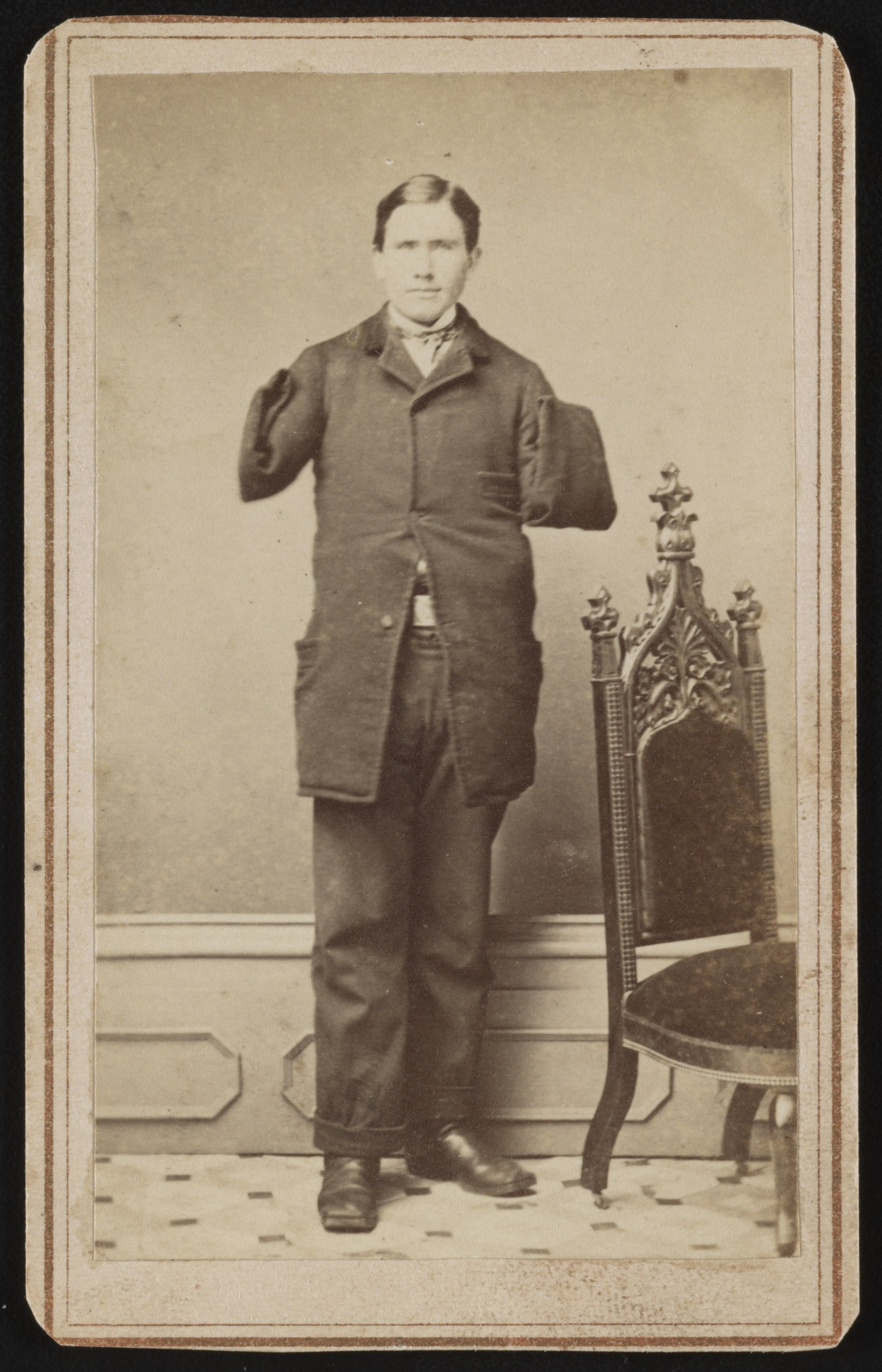
Richard D. Dunphy served aboard USS Hartford during the Civil War and was wounded in the Battle of Mobile Bay. He was awarded the Medal of Honor.

With the Mississippi River now opened, Farragut turned his attention to Mobile, a Confederate industrial center still building ships and turning out war supplies. The Battle of Mobile Bay took place on 5 August 1864. Farragut, with Hartford, captained by Percival Drayton, as his flagship, led a fleet consisting of four ironclad monitors and 14 wooden vessels. The Confederate naval force was composed of newly built ram Tennessee, Admiral Franklin Buchanan's flagship, and gunboats Selma, Morgan, and Gaines; and backed by the powerful guns of Forts Morgan and Gaines in the Bay. From the firing of the first gun by Fort Morgan to the raising of the white flag of surrender by Tennessee little more than three hours elapsed—but three hours of terrific fighting on both sides. The Confederates had only 32 casualties, while the Union forces suffered 335 casualties, including 113 men drowned in Tecumseh when the monitor struck a "torpedo" mine and sank.

Twelve of Hartford's sailors were awarded the Medal of Honor for their actions at the Battle of Mobile Bay. Their names follow:

- Landsman Wilson Brown
- Ordinary Seaman Bartholomew Diggins
- Coal Heaver Richard D. Dunphy
- Coxswain Thomas Fitzpatrick
- Pilot Martin Freeman
- Coal Heaver James R. Garrison
- Landsman John Lawson
- Captain of the Forecastle John McFarland
- Ordinary Seaman Charles Melville
- Coal Heaver Thomas O'Connell
- Landsman William Pelham
- Shell Man William A. Stanley

=== Prizes and adjudication ===
Date	Ship Type	Prize Name	Gross Proceeds	Costs and Expenses	Amount for Distribution	Where Adjudicated	Sent to 4th Auditor for Distribution	Vessels Entitled to Share
8 Apr 1863		J. D. Clark						

=== Pacific, 1865–1899 ===
Returning to New York on 13 December, Hartford decommissioned for repairs a week later. Back in shape in July 1865, she served as flagship of a newly organized Asiatic Squadron until August 1868 when she returned to New York and decommissioned. Recommissioned on 9 October 1872, she resumed Asiatic Station patrol until returning home on 19 October 1875. Two of her crewmen, Ordinary Seaman John Costello and Ordinary Seaman Richard Ryan, were awarded the Medal of Honor for rescuing drowning shipmates in separate 1876 incidents. In 1882, as Captain Stephen B. Luce's flagship of the North Atlantic Station, Hartford visited the Caroline Island, Hawaii, and Valparaíso, Chile, before arriving San Francisco on 17 March 1884. She then cruised in the Pacific until decommissioning 14 January 1887 at Mare Island, California, for apprentice sea-training use.

From 1890 to 1899 Hartford was laid up at Mare Island, the last five years of which she was being rebuilt.

=== Training ship in the Atlantic 1899–1926 ===
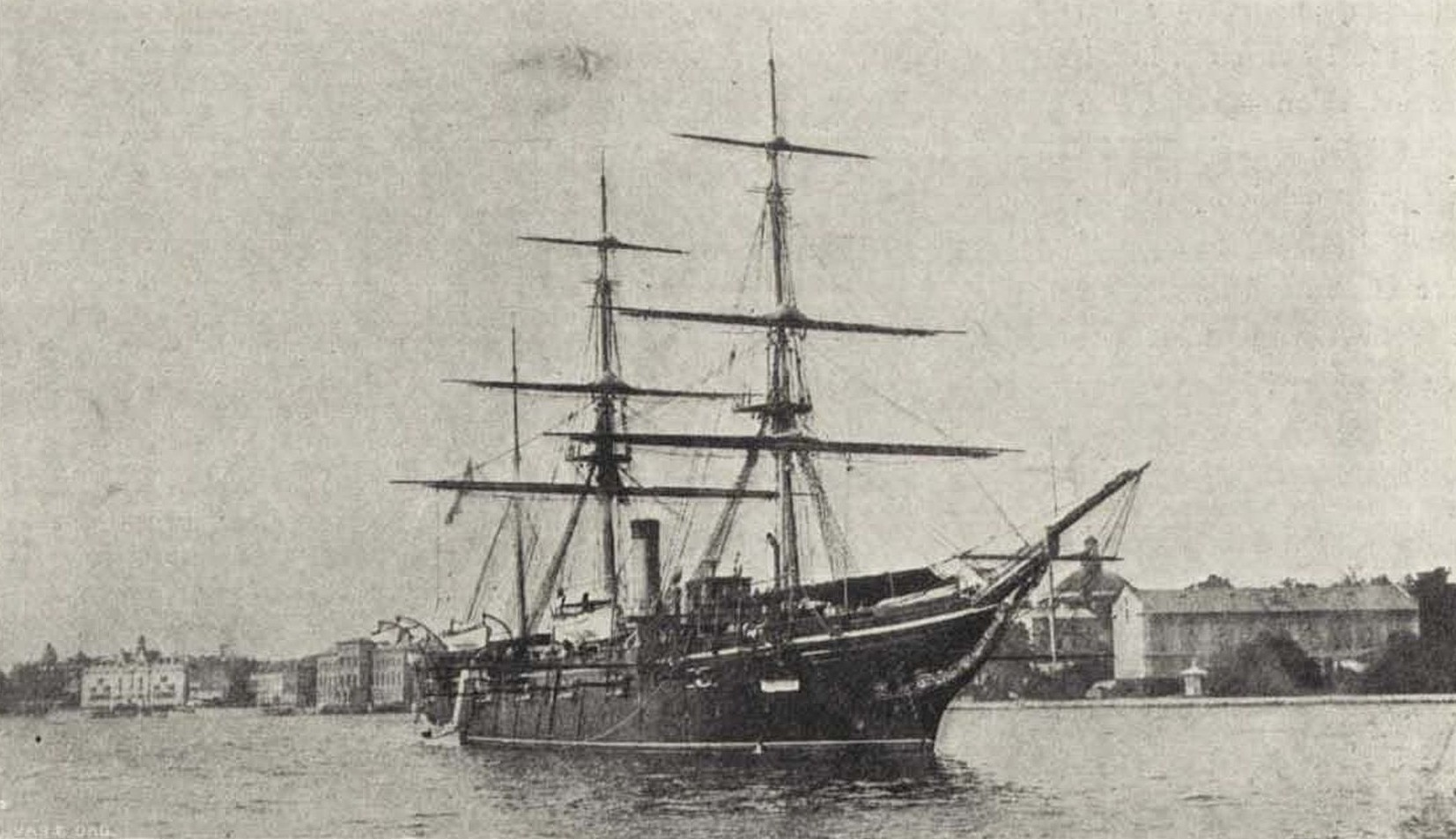
USS Hartford in 1901, during a naval visit to Sweden

On 2 October 1899, Harford recommissioned, then transferred to the Atlantic coast to be used for a training and cruise ship for midshipmen. In January 1903, she was reported to visit France, including Villefranche-sur-Mer and Marseille. She served as training ship until 24 October 1912 when she was transferred to Charleston, for use as a station ship.

=== Final years, 1926–1956 ===
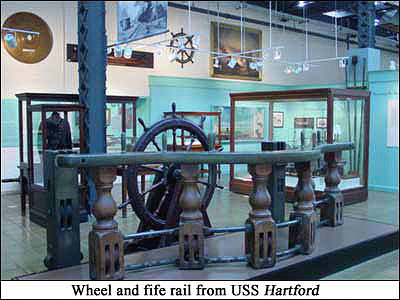
Wheel and fife rail from USS Hartford; displayed at the U.S. Navy Museum in Washington, D.C.

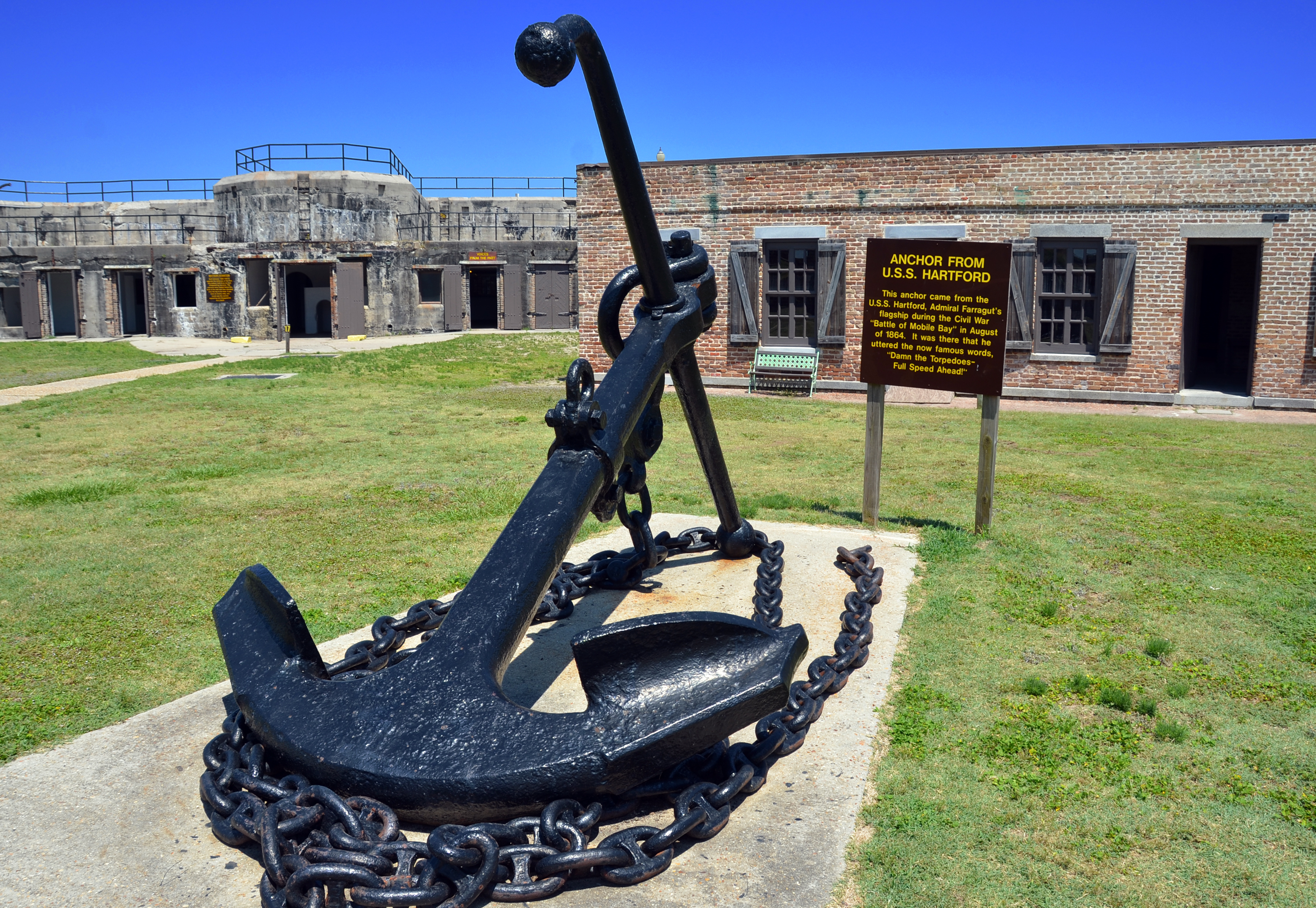
Anchor from USS Hartford; displayed in the courtyard of Fort Gaines (Alabama).

Again placed out of commission 20 August 1926, Hartford remained at Charleston until moved to Washington, D.C., on 18 October 1938. President Franklin D. Roosevelt wanted to build a naval museum there featuring the Hartford, USS Olympia, and a four-stack destroyer from World War I. When Roosevelt died, plans to establish this museum and to save the ships were abandoned. On 19 October 1945, Hartford was towed to the Norfolk Navy Yard and classified as a relic. The ship was allowed to deteriorate, and as a result, Hartford sank at her berth on 20 November 1956. She proved to be beyond salvage and was subsequently dismantled.

== Remains ==
Major relics from her are at various locations:

- Her wheel and fife rail are displayed at the U.S. Navy Museum in Washington, D.C.
- A rowboat from Hartford is located at the National Civil War Naval Museum at Port Columbus
- One of her anchors now sits at the University of Hartford
- Another of her anchors and a cathead are on display at Mystic Seaport in Mystic, Connecticut.
- A third anchor is on display at Fort Gaines (Alabama) in Dauphin Island, Alabama, United States.
- One of her Parrott rifles is on display in Freeport, New York.
- Two of her Dahlgren smoothbore cannon are on display at Trinity College in Hartford, Connecticut
- One of her Dahlgren smoothbore cannon is on display in Alden Park at Mare Island Naval Shipyard near Vallejo, California
- Three Dahlgren cannon on display in Mackinaw City, Michigan
- IX-inch Dahlgren cannon which served on USS Hartford survive at:

Hagerstown, Maryland- Tredegar Iron Works registry #117
Cheboygan, Michigan- Cyrus Alger & Co. #225
Mare Island, California- Cyrus Alger & Co. #228
Vallejo, California- Cyrus Alger & Co. #229
Hartford, Connecticut- Cyrus Alger & Co. #247 & #248
Petoskey, Michigan- Cyrus Alger & Co. #249
Gaylord, Michigan- Cyrus Alger & Co. #250

- Her figurehead is displayed in the Connecticut State Capitol
- Her billethead, trailboards and other items are on display at the Mariners' Museum in Newport News, Virginia.
- Her capstan, a cathead and the quarterdeck brass treadplate reside in St. Petersburg, Florida at Admiral Farragut Academy, a college preparatory school named after her captain
- Metal from the propeller of Hartford was used in the statue of David Farragut at Farragut Square in downtown Washington, D.C.
- Unspecified relic(s) are at the Washington Navy Yard
- Her ship's bell can be found on Constitution Plaza in Hartford, Connecticut (in front of the Old State House) in the eastern courtyard by the clock tower
- Her hatch cover is used as a coffee table in the Superintendent's office at the United States Naval Academy in Annapolis, Maryland

== See also ==
- Blockade runners of the American Civil War
- Bibliography of American Civil War naval history
