= USS Margaret (SP-527) =

Civilian ship requisitioned by the U.S. Navy for WW1

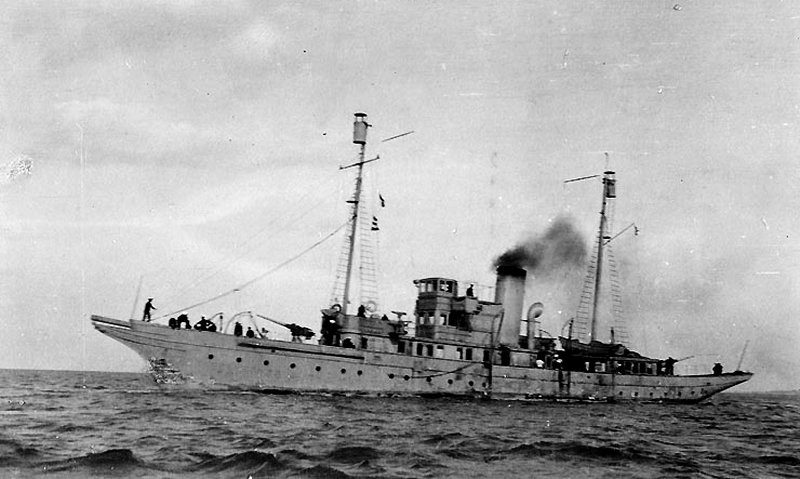
- USS Margaret (SP-527) leaving Bermuda for the Azores in November 1917.

History

United States
- Name: USS Margaret
- Namesake: Previous name retained
- Builder: Delaware River Iron Ship Building and Engine Works, Chester, Pennsylvania
- Cost: $104,000 USD (Navy acquisition price)
- Completed: 1899
- Acquired: August 1917
- Commissioned: 16 October 1917
- Decommissioned: November 1918
- Nickname(s): Maggie
- Fate: Sold 30 September 1921

General characteristics
- Type: Patrol vessel
- Tonnage: 245 gross register tons
- Length: 176 ft (54 m) (overall); 143 ft (44 m) (waterline)
- Beam: 21 ft (6.4 m)
- Draft: 11 ft (3.4 m)
- Propulsion: Two Almy boilers, one 728-indicated horsepower (543-kilowatt) vertical triple-expansion steam engine, one shaft
- Speed: 12 knots (rated); 6 knots (operationally)
- Armament: 2 × 3-inch (76.2-mm) guns; Depth charge racks

USS Margaret (SP-527) was a yacht acquired by the U.S. Navy during World War I and in commission as a patrol vessel from 1917 to 1918. She was assigned to escort and patrol duty in the North Atlantic Ocean. Unfortunately, she had numerous mechanical problems and her commanding officer – Lieutenant Commander Frank Jack Fletcher (1885–1973), a future admiral and aircraft carrier task force commander of World War II – did not consider her an effective fighting ship. Fletcher would finally ask the Navy to condemn her as unfit for naval service – something the Navy promptly did.

== Construction, acquisition, conversion, and commissioning ==
Margaret, was built in 1899 by Delaware River Iron Ship Building and Engine Works at Chester, Pennsylvania, as the private steam yacht Eugenia. She later was renamed Marjorie and then Margaret. She was not intended for seagoing service, having a quite narrow beam for her length and making her prone to incurring damage in a seaway, and was designed to allow her wealthy owner to entertain people aboard in an opulent setting in a safe harbor. Her final private owner, Isaac Emerson, the chief executive officer of Bromo-Seltzer, ensured that she had a fine wine galley and an exquisite dining area.

In August 1917, the U.S. Navy purchased Margaret from Emerson for overseas service as a patrol vessel in World War I, paying $104,000 USD for her, $10,000 more than her assessed value of $94,000. The yacht's fragility had resulted in premature aging and warping of her hull, and she was found to be top-heavy. Nonetheless, she underwent conversion to a patrol vessel. Her impressive wooden civilian masts were replaced by stubbier ones that were more suited to naval service, her dining area was converted into a berthing compartment, and her boom was removed. A chart house, pilot house, and bridge with wings were added, as were two 3-inch (76.2-mm) guns (one forward and one aft) and depth charge racks.

After conversion, Margaret's top-heaviness had increased, her stern sagged under the weight of the added naval equipment, and she rode so deep in the water that her portholes were barely above the waterline even when she was in port. She also suffered from numerous leaks.

When her first commanding officer, Lieutenant Commander Fletcher, reported aboard, he ordered Margaret to undergo post-conversion sea trials. These revealed Margaret's top-heaviness, and also showed that she could make no more than 6 knots under ideal conditions and usually no more than 4 knots in a calm sea - too slow to outrun the blast effects of her own depth charges. She rolled heavily, and was prone to engine breakdowns; her trials began with her losing power in a current and striking a pier, fouling her anchor on it, and ripping her anchor stanchion off. Fletcher assessed that she needed 35 additional tons of ballast, but could find room for no more than five tons.

With no experienced officers aboard except Fletcher, USS Margaret (SP-527) was commissioned on 16 October 1917. During the ceremony, an inexperienced seaman hoisted the United States flag upside down.

== World War I service ==
=== The voyage to Bermuda ===
On 4 November 1917, Margaret departed the United States on a voyage to the Azores via Bermuda as part of a squadron composed of the patrol vessels USS May (SP-164) (which served as flagship), USS Wenonah (SP-165), USS Helenita (SP-210), USS Utowana (SP-951), USS Rambler (SP-211), and Margaret and the supply ship USS Hannibal. On the voyage, each of the patrols vessels towed a submarine chaser; Margaret was assigned to tow the submarine chaser SC-317, which had been transferred to the French Navy, while SC-317's French crew learned how to operate her. The flotilla suffered many mishaps during the voyage.

Not far from port, Fletcher ordered a test-firing of Margaret's guns; the forward gun's backrush blew out the forecastle locker door and the after gun blew out the stern rail and opened additional leaks; Fletcher then ordered the gunnery officer never to fire the guns again. A storm struck on the first night at sea, rendering all but two of the men on board Margaret too seasick to carry out their duties, exaggerating the ship's leaks, and causing the condenser and steering gear to fail; as a result, the ship had to be steered manually with ropes attached to her tiller and there was a shortage of potable water that forced Fletcher to ration water strictly.

After three days, Margaret broke down and was adrift; Utowana was ordered to tow her but also broke down. Although Margaret managed to get underway again, she ran out of coal halfway to Bermuda and thus lost all power, lights, pumps, and communications, forcing Fletcher to order a bucket brigade to dump water overboard to keep the ship from capsizing. She rolled heavily, losing her engine room cowl overboard and causing her anchor to give way and run all the way out on 105 fathoms (630 feet or 192 meters) of chain, and her tow line to SC-317 parted. The donkey engine broke, and the crew had to haul in both the anchor chain and the tow line manually.

The flotilla finally arrived at Hamilton, Bermuda, on 9 November 1917. When Margaret's dory was sent for caulking material ashore, it broke down and had to be towed in. Margaret's low priority for logistical support meant that her crew had a very hard time getting anything there that they needed for repairs.

=== The voyage to the Azores ===
Margaret departed Bermuda on 18 November 1917, bound for the Azores in company with May, Hannibal, Wenonah, Rambler, and the patrol vessels USS Artemis (SP-593), USS Cythera (SP-575), and USS Lydonia (SP-700), and the six submarine chasers that had been towed on the previous voyage. Fletcher had arranged for two piles of soft coal to be dumped on Margaret's deck for the voyage to avoid again running out of coal, as well as lumber for repairs, and the crew filled lifeboats and bathtubs with potable water. All this served to make Margaret even more top-heavy.

During the voyage, May spotted an enemy steamer; the flotilla gave chase, but was so slow that the steamer simply turned away and outran it. Later, SC-317 signalled for help; she had broken down, and after May and Wenonah retrieved her, Margaret again took SC-317 under tow - but Margaret again ran out of coal and Cythera had to tow Margaret. The eventful voyage also saw many alarms over false sightings of what were thought to be enemy submarines and torpedoes. By the time the voyage concluded at Horta in the Azores on 5 December 1918, half of the flotilla's ships were under tow by the other half.

=== Operations in the Azores ===
In the Azores, Fletcher found it as hard to procure supplies and spare parts for Margaret as he had at Bermuda. A hurricane struck, and Margaret and the other patrol vessels began dragging their anchors; one of them collided with Margaret, and Margaret eventually had to secure herself to a mooring buoy.

After a German submarine sank a Portuguese barkentine near the Azores, Margaret was sent out to find the submarine. She found nothing. After Margaret returned to port, the submarine's commanding officer broadcast a radio message in the clear saying that he had sighted Margaret but had not bothered to attack her because she was not worth the cost of a torpedo.

Fletcher eventually prevailed in getting a survey made of Margaret to assess her condition. The survey, conducted in the Azores, found that her deck leaked, her condenser was irreparable, her steam drums were badly worn down and could generate less than half the steam pressure they were supposed to, her crew quarters were uninhabitable, and living conditions were very bad. The Commander, Azores Detachment, A. W. Osteshans, judged Margaret as unsuited for further service as a patrol vessel and as "nothing more than a piece of junk."

After that, Margaret was no longer issued orders to put to sea, and instead served as accommodation for her crew and as a storage vessel. During this period, a Gunner's Mate Davis, serving as petty officer of the watch aboard Margaret, heard cries for help from the harbor and dived in to rescue a man who had attempted to swim from another boat to shore and became fatigued. Davis received a letter of commendation for his action.

After Fletcher was ordered to another ship, Margaret's succeeding commanding officers stayed aboard only a few weeks each before also moving on. Her final commanding officer was her senior enlisted man, after which all of her crew were transferred elsewhere.

== Decommissioning and disposal ==
Margaret remained in the Azores for the rest of World War I. She returned to the United States following the 11 November 1918 Armistice with Germany and was decommissioned that month. She was sold to an Italian firm for scrap for US$12,000 on 30 September 1921.
