= USS Utowana (SP-951) =

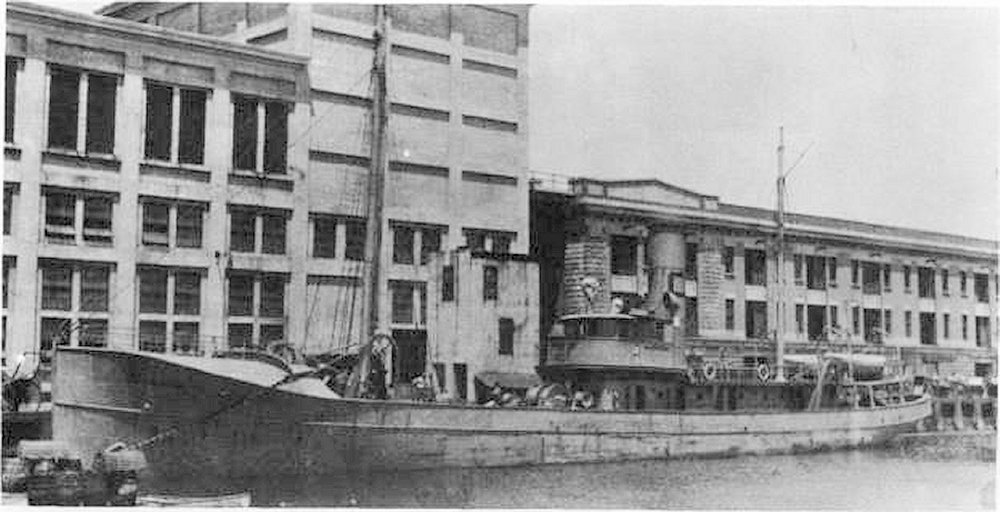
- Utowana (American Trawler, ex-Yacht, 1891) in port, probably shortly after she was converted from a yacht to a trawler in 1917.

History

United States
- Name: USS Utowana
- Builder: Neafie and Levy, Philadelphia, Pennsylvania
- Laid down: 1891
- Acquired: by the Navy in the summer of 1917
- Commissioned: 30 October 1917 as USS Utowana (SP 951)
- Decommissioned: 11 September 1919
- Renamed: USS Victorine (SP-951) (date not known)
- Stricken: circa 1919
- Fate: Sold 13 September 1920

General characteristics
- Type: Trawler
- Tonnage: 414 gross tons
- Length: 168 ft 9 in (51.44 m)
- Beam: 27 ft 9 in (8.46 m)
- Draft: 15 ft 9 in (4.80 m)
- Propulsion: steam engine
- Speed: 12 mph
- Complement: 32 officers and enlisted
- Armament: not known

USS Utowana (SP-951) – also known as USS Victorine (SP-951) -- was a fishing trawler acquired by the U.S. Navy during World War I. The Navy had planned to use her as a minesweeper based out of Kittery, Maine; however, Utowana spent most of her service time operating as an armed patrol craft, responsible for escorting Allied ships across the dangerous North Atlantic Ocean. She served through the war and the armistice before returning to the United States for decommissioning.

== A yacht built in Philadelphia ==
Utowana (SP-951) -- a yacht built in 1891 at Philadelphia, Pennsylvania, by Neafle & Levy for colorful architect William West Durant and rebuilt as a trawler at Staten Island, New York, in 1917 for the Commonwealth Fisheries Co., Boston, Massachusetts—was acquired by the Navy during the summer of 1917 for service as a minesweeper in the 1st Naval District and placed in commission on 30 October 1917.

== Caribbean Service ==
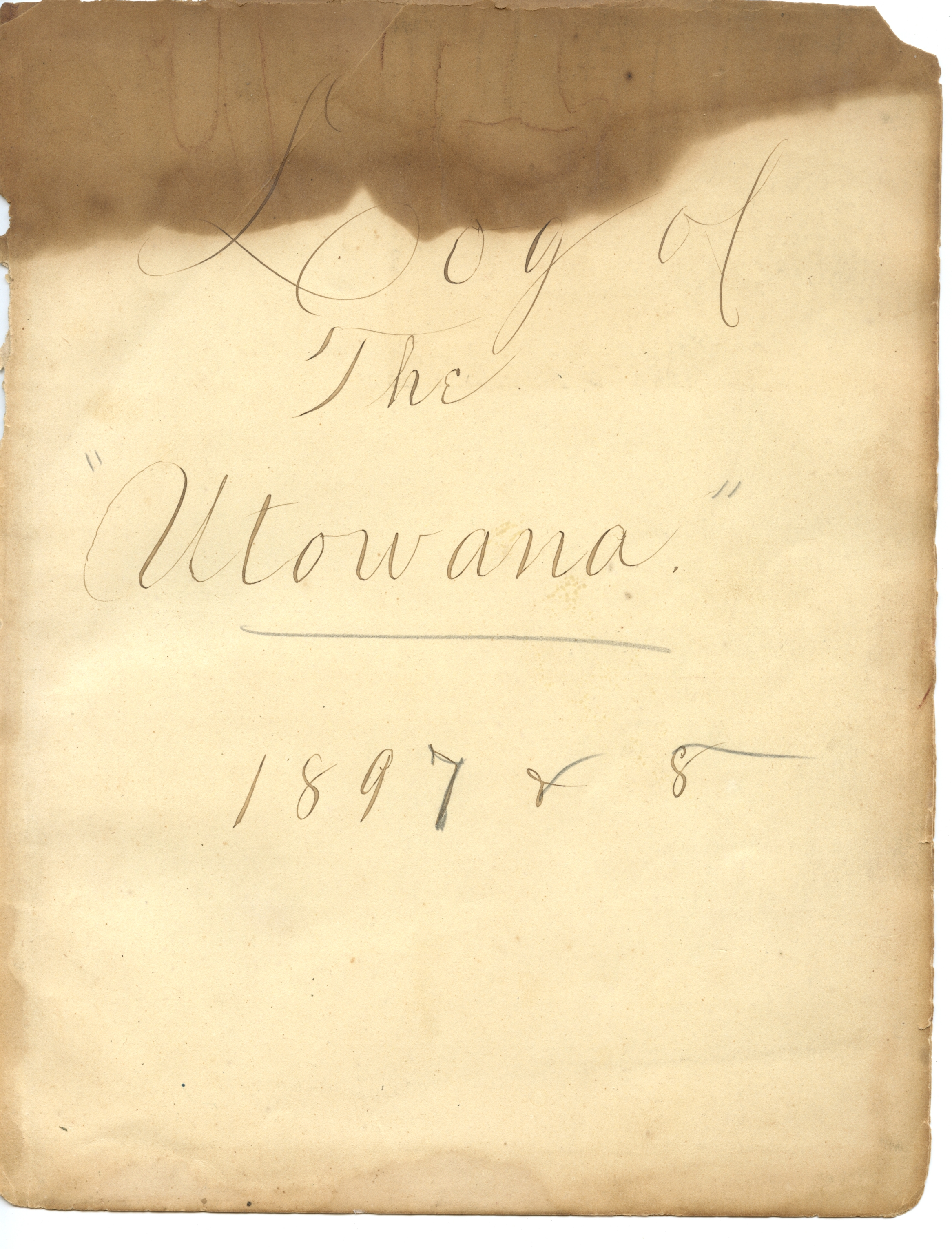
USS Utowana Log File Page 01 1897-1898 02

A discovered log from 1897 to 1898 documents the Utowana's travels in the Caribbean and subsequent return to harbor.

== World War I service ==
Though some records indicate that the ship was later renamed Victorine, they give no date for the renaming. Moreover, the trawler was consistently referred to thereafter as Utowana both in official and unofficial publications.

In any event, the trawler was assigned to Division 13, Squadron 5, Patrol Force. That organization, made up various types of ships and craft, was responsible for patrol and escort duties overseas. In addition to the European bases such as Brest in France and Queenstown in Ireland, ships of the Patrol Force operated in such diverse areas as the Caribbean and the Azores.

While no records have been found indicating where Utowana served before arriving on the French coast early in 1918, she operated briefly at Bermuda and perhaps for a short period at Ponta Delgada in the Azores.

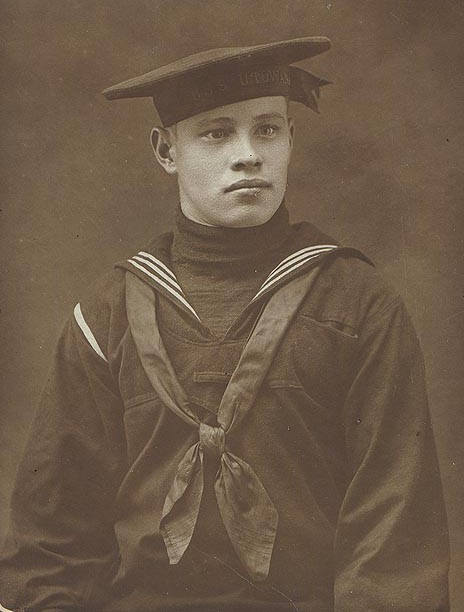
A U.S. Navy Sailor - Sepia-toned photographic portrait, taken circa 1917–1919. His cap band indicates that he was assigned to USS Utowana (SP-951).

=== Crossing the Atlantic ===
It is known that she departed Newport, Rhode Island, on 4 November 1917 in company with Hannibal, Helenita (SP-210), Margaret (SP-527), May (SP-164), Rambler (SP-211), and Wenonah (SP-165). Each yacht towed a submarine chaser. After five days at sea and in spite of a breakdown apiece for Margaret, May, Helenita and Utowana, the little task group arrived in Hamilton, Bermuda.

Apparently, Helenita and Utowana remained behind in Bermuda when the other four yachts—augmented by Cythera (SP-575), Artemis (SP-593), and Lydonia (SP-700) departed Hamilton on 18 November bound for Ponta Delgada. Presumably, Utowana—like Helenita—stayed in Bermuda to conduct patrols in surrounding waters, though it is also possible that she remained behind for repairs. Records giving details simply do not exist.

In any event, the former yacht reached the French coast in February 1918. Thereafter, in all probability, she provided escort services to coastal convoys and conducted antisubmarine patrols of French coastal waters.

== Post-war service ==
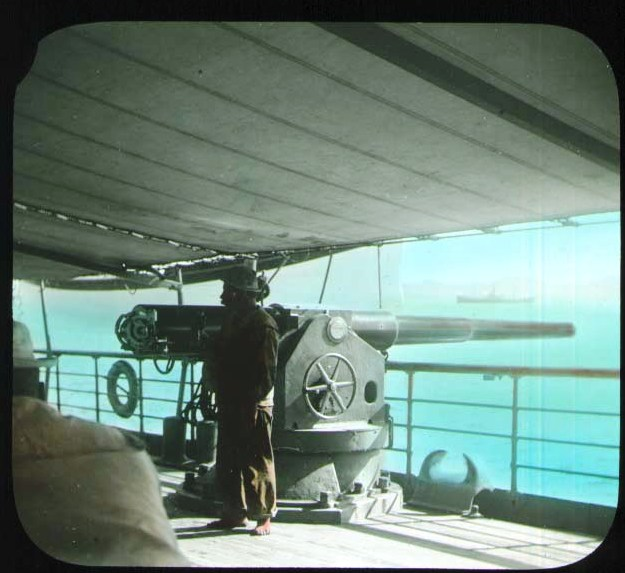
Rapid fire gun on the Utowana, 1899

About the time of the armistice, the armed trawler began to assist Favorite (SP-1385) in salvage and repair work. Following the armistice, she probably continued her salvage work.

== Post-war decommissioning ==
Utowana returned to the United States in August 1919 and was assigned to the 3d Naval District. She was placed out of commission on 11 September 1919. Just over a year later, on 13 September 1920, she was sold to the Denton Shore Lumber Co., Tampa, Florida.

In the mid-1920s, "Utowana" was purchased by Allison V. Armour and refitted for scientific exploration (1926 - 1927) in the Canary Islands, the Balearic Islands, Southeast Asia, and West Africa. Source: The story appears in David Fairchild's book "Exploring for Plants" (1930), including, for example, references on pp. 1 – 2, a photo in the Gambia River on p. 9, an extensive description on p 186 (On the Utowana to Teneriffe), 221 (Grand Canary and Lanzarote), 234 (Balearic Islands), Ceylon (282), and West Africa (457). A photo of Utowana after refitting appears on p. 9. On p. 580 Fairchild again refers to the Utowana expedition. David Fairchild's later book "The World Grows Round My Door" (1947) says that the yacht "disappeared in the explosions of war" (307). He mentions yellowing photographs.
