= USS Chauncey (DD-3) =

Bainbridge-class destroyer

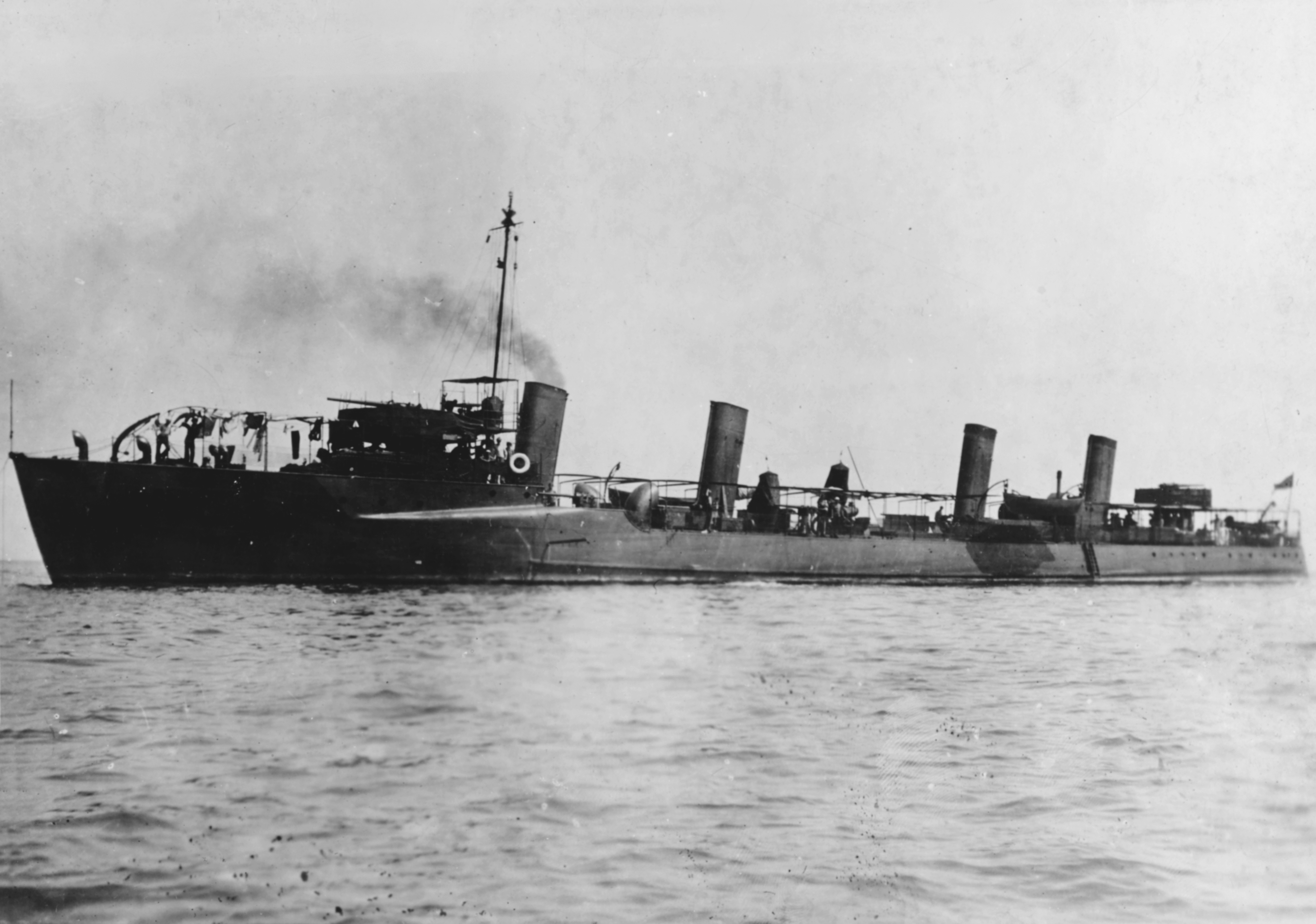
- USS Chauncey photographed prior to World War I.

History

United States
- Name: Chauncey
- Namesake: Commedore Isaac Chauncey
- Ordered: 4 May 1898
- Awarded: 1 October 1898
- Builder: Neafie and Levy Ship and Engine Building Company of Philadelphia, Pennsylvania
- Laid down: 2 December 1899
- Launched: 26 October 1901
- Commissioned: 20 November 1902 (reduced commission)
- Decommissioned: 2 December 1902 (placed in reserve)
- Commissioned: 21 February 1903
- Decommissioned: 3 December 1905
- Commissioned: 12 January 1907
- Out of service: 19 November 1917
- Stricken: 17 December 1917
- Fate: Sunk in collision with cargo ship SS Rose 110 miles (180 kilometres) west of Gibraltar 19 November 1917

General characteristics
- Class & type: Bainbridge-class destroyer
- Displacement: 420 long tons (430 t) (standard); 592 long tons (601 t) (full load)
- Length: 245 ft (74.7 m) (pp); 250 ft (76.2 m) (oa)
- Beam: 23 ft 7 in (7.2 m)
- Draft: 6 ft 6 in (2 m) (mean)
- Installed power: 4 × Thornycroft boilers; 8,000 ihp (6,000 kW)
- Propulsion: 2 × Vertical triple expansion engines; 2 × Propellers
- Speed: 29 kn (54 km/h; 33 mph) (designed speed)
- Complement: 3 officers; 72 enlisted men
- Armament: 2 × 3 in (76 mm)/50 caliber guns; 5 × 6-pounder (57 mm (2.2 in)) guns; 2 × 18 in (457 mm) torpedo tubes

The first USS Chauncey was a Bainbridge-class destroyer, also referred to as a "Torpedo-boat destroyer", in the United States Navy named for Commodore Isaac Chauncey. She was launched in 1901 and sunk in 1917.

== Construction and design ==
Chauncey was laid down at Neafie and Levy Ship and Engine Building Company of Philadelphia, Pennsylvania on 2 December 1899 as a member of the Bainbridge class, (Note: Some sources state that Torpedo Boat Destroyers 1–5 comprised the Bainbridge class, while other sources state that four more very similar ships (Torpedo Boat Destroyers 10–13) were also part of the same class.) and was launched on 26 October 1901.

Chauncey was 249 ft 9 7/8 in (76.15 m) long overall and 244 ft 2 7/8 in (74.44 m) at the waterline, with a beam of 23 ft 5 in (7.14 m) and a draft of 6 ft 6 in (1.98 m). As the Bainbridge class was intended to be more seaworthy than the US Navy's torpedo boats, the ship had a raised forecastle instead of the "turtleback" forecastle common in European designs. Design displacement was 420 long tons (430 t) and 631 long tons (641 t) full load, although all ships of the class were overweight. Four Thornycroft boilers fed steam at 250 psi (1,700 kPa) to triple expansion steam engines rated at 8,000 ihp (6,000 kW) driving two shafts for a design speed of 28 kn (52 km/h; 32 mph). Four funnels were fitted. Armament consisted of two 3-inch (76 mm)/50 caliber guns, five 6-pounder (57 millimetres (2.2 in)) guns and two 18-inch (457 mm) torpedo tubes.

Chauncey was placed in reduced commission on 20 November 1902, then placed in reserve on 2 December 1902 and received full commission on 21 February 1903. Lieutenant Stanford Elwood Moses was placed in command and Chauncey reported to the Atlantic Fleet.

== Pre-World War I ==
Chauncey served with the Coast Squadron until 20 September 1903, when she was transferred to the Asiatic Fleet and left Key West for the Orient on 18 December. After sailing by way of the Suez Canal, she arrived at Cavite to join the force representing US interest in the Far East as it cruised in the Philippines during winters and off China during summers. Aside from the period of 3 December 1905 – 12 January 1907, when she was in reserve at Cavite, Chauncey continued this service until the entrance of America into World War I.

=== Sinking ===
The destroyer sailed from Cavite on 1 August 1917 for convoy escort duty in the eastern Atlantic, based at St. Nazaire, France. On 19 November, while about 110 mi (180 km) west of Gibraltar on escort duty, Chauncey was rammed by the British merchantman SS Rose as both ships steamed in war-imposed darkness. At 03:17, Chauncey sank in 1,500 fathoms (9,000 ft; 2,700 m) of water, taking to their death 21 men including her captain, Lieutenant Commander Walter E. Reno, the namesake of the Clemson-class destroyer Reno, and LTJG Charles F. Wedderburn, the namesake of the Fletcher-class destroyer Wedderburn. Seventy survivors were picked up by Rose, and carried to port.

== Chauncey in literature ==
The novel Delilah was written by a survivor of Chauncey, Marcus Goodrich, and is a fictional account based on his experience serving aboard Chauncey as an enlisted man.

== Noteworthy commanding officers ==
- Ensign Joseph Rollie Defrees (26 September 1905 – 3 December 1905) (Later Rear Admiral)
- Lieutenant Frank Jack Fletcher (18 April 1912 – 21 December 1912) (Later Admiral) - Fletcher-class destroyer named for his uncle, Medal of Honor recipient Admiral Frank F. Fletcher.

== Bibliography ==
=== Books ===
- Chesneau, Roger; Kolesnik, Eugene M. (1979). Conway's All The World's Fighting Ships 1860–1905. London: Conway Maritime Press. ISBN 0-85177-133-5.
- Friedman, Norman (1982). U.S. Destroyers: An Illustrated History. Annapolis, Maryland, USA: Naval Institute Press. ISBN 0-87021-733-X.
- Osborne, Eric W. (2005). Destroyers: An Illustrated History of their Impact. Santa Barbara, California, USA: ABC-Clio. ISBN 1-85109-484-9.

=== Online sources ===
- Willshaw, Fred. "USS Chauncey (DD-3)". NavSource.
- "Chauncey I (DD-3)". Dictionary of American Naval Fighting Ships. Naval History and Heritage Command. 30 June 2015.
- "Wedderburn (DD-684)". Dictionary of American Naval Fighting Ships. Naval History and Heritage Command. 5 April 2016.
- "Reno I (Destroyer No. 303)". Dictionary of American Naval Fighting Ships. Naval History and Heritage Command. 25 February 2016.
- Haislip, Harvey, CAPT USN. (1977). "A Memory of Ships". Proceedings CIII. United States Naval Institute.
