= Caleb Rochford Stetson =

American minister (1871–1932)

The Reverend Caleb Rochford Stetson STD, D.D.
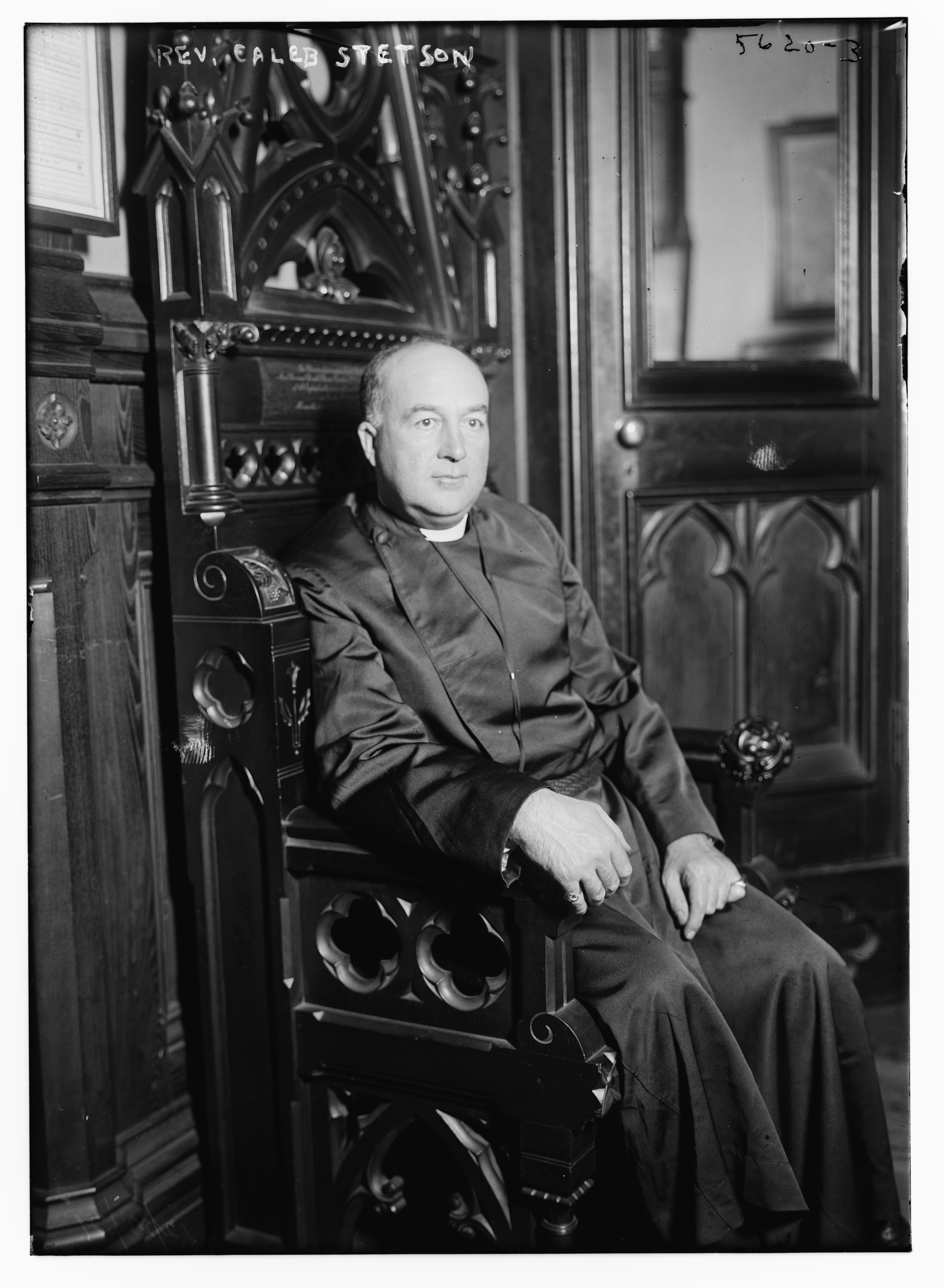
- Stetson in 1900

Personal details
- Born: April 16, 1871 Boston, Massachusetts, U.S.
- Died: June 15, 1932 (aged 61) Manhattan, New York City, U.S.
- Buried: Trinity Church Cemetery and Mausoleum, Hamilton Heights, Manhattan, New York City, U.S.
- Spouse: Helen Richards (m. 1914–1932; his death)
- Education: Harvard University

Reverend Caleb Rochford Stetson (April 16, 1871 – June 15, 1932) was an American Anglican minister who served as the eleventh rector of Trinity Church in New York City from 1921 until his death eleven years later.

== Early life ==
Stetson was born in 1871 in Boston, Massachusetts, to George Rochford Stetson and Helen Sybil Avery. He was their second child, born four years after Susan, who went on to marry Admiral Frank F. Fletcher.

Stetson graduated from Harvard University in 1894, before studying medicine at John Hopkins School of Medicine. He also attended the Virginia Theological Seminary in Alexandria, Virginia, for a year, then the General Theological Seminary in New York City. He graduated in 1898.

== Career ==
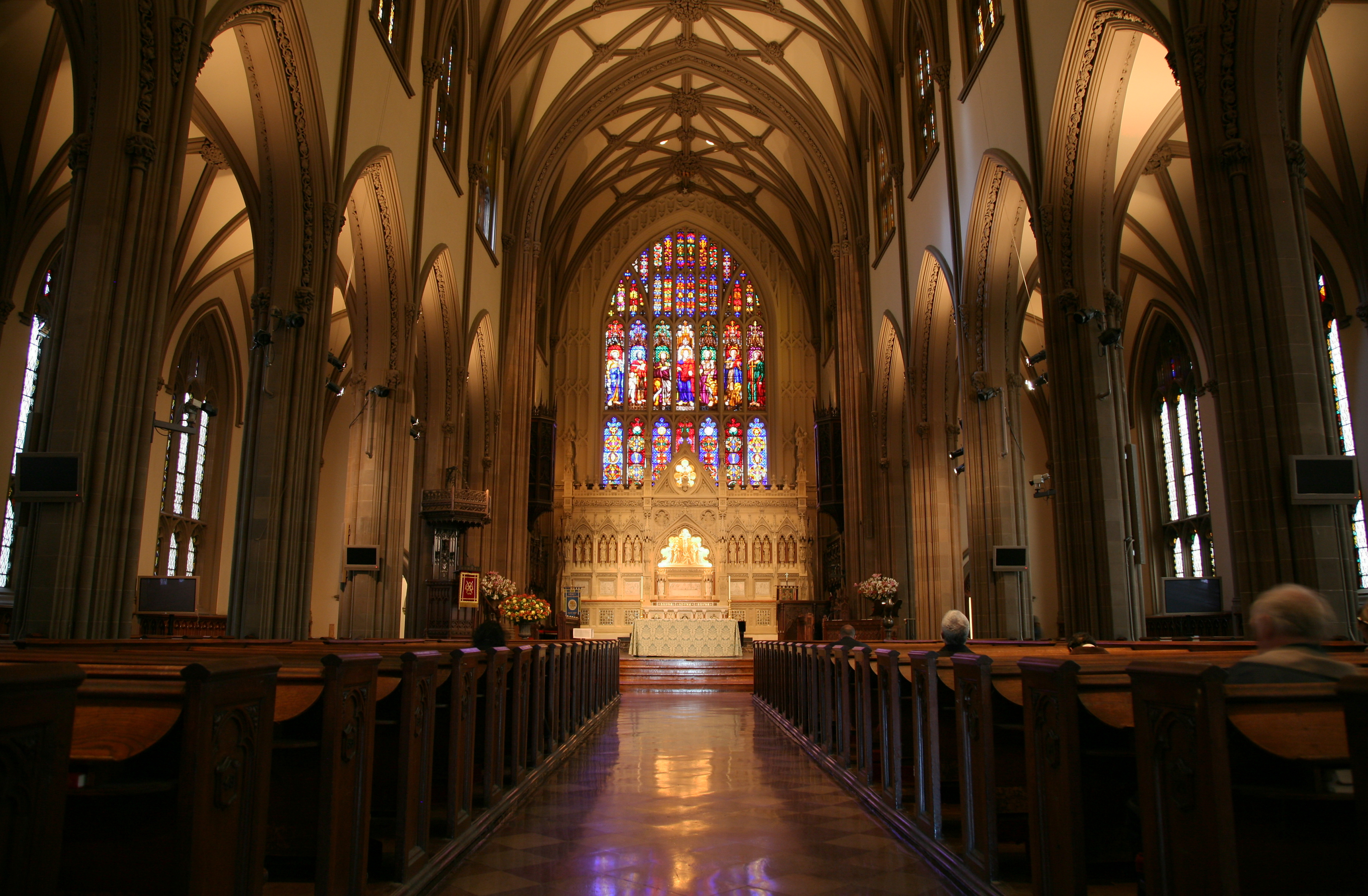
Trinity Church

Stetson was ordained a deacon in 1898 and became a priest the following year. For the next seven years, he was in charge of the Cathedral Mission Chapel of the Good Shepherd in Washington, D.C.

He became vicar of Trinity Church in Manhattan, New York City, in 1907. He served for four years. He then worked for a decade as rector of St. Mark's Church in Washington, D.C. He became the eleventh rector of Trinity in 1921, succeeding Bishop William Thomas Manning, whom he had previously worked under.

A staunch opponent of divorce, Stetson wrote about The Indissolubility of the Marriage Bond in church publications.

He was a president of the New York Churchmen's Association, a trustee of Columbia University, of the General Theological Seminary, Sailors' Snug Harbor, the Cathedral of St. John the Divine, Leak and Watts Orphan Asylum, the Protestant Episcopal City Mission Society, the American Church Building Fund, the Episcopal Publication Society, St. Stephen's College and the Society for Promoting Religion and Learning.

== Personal life ==
Stetson married his cousin, Helen Richards, daughter of Boston's Henry C. Richards and Helen L. Stetson, in 1914.

He was bestowed with an honorary degree of Doctor of Sacred Theology from Columbia University, the General Seminary, Hobart College and the University of the South. He was given an honorary degree of Doctor of Divinity by St. Stephen's College.

== Death ==
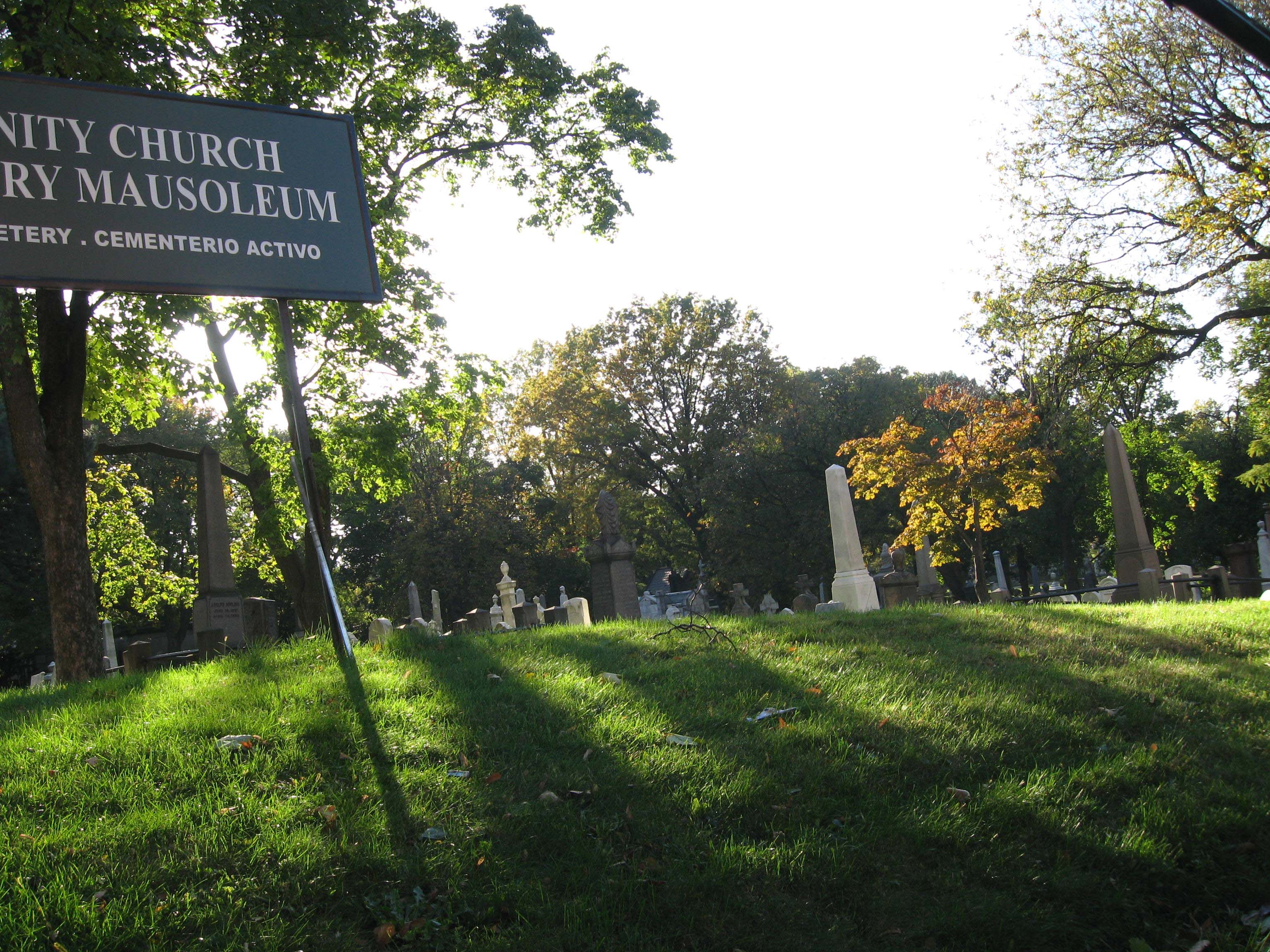
Trinity Church Cemetery and Mausoleum, Stetson's resting place

Stetson died at Manhattan's St. Luke's Hospital in 1932, aged 61, of heart disease. His funeral, officiated by Bishop Manning, was held at Trinity Church on June 18. His body was held in a receiving vault in Trinity Church Cemetery and Mausoleum in Hamilton Heights, Manhattan. It was believed to have initially been only a temporary resting place, with a possible reinterment at Mount Auburn Cemetery in his native Massachusetts.

He was succeeded as rector of Trinity Church by Frederic Sydney Fleming.

Stetson's widow died in 1935, aged 60, from pneumonia. She had been living at 50 East 10th Street in Manhattan. She was buried beside her husband. In her will, she bequeathed $26,000 to religious, charitable and educational facilities. She also arranged for 40% of her residuary estate to be donated to the General Theological Seminary for a scholarship fund in memory of her husband.
