= USS Wedderburn =

Fletcher-class destroyer

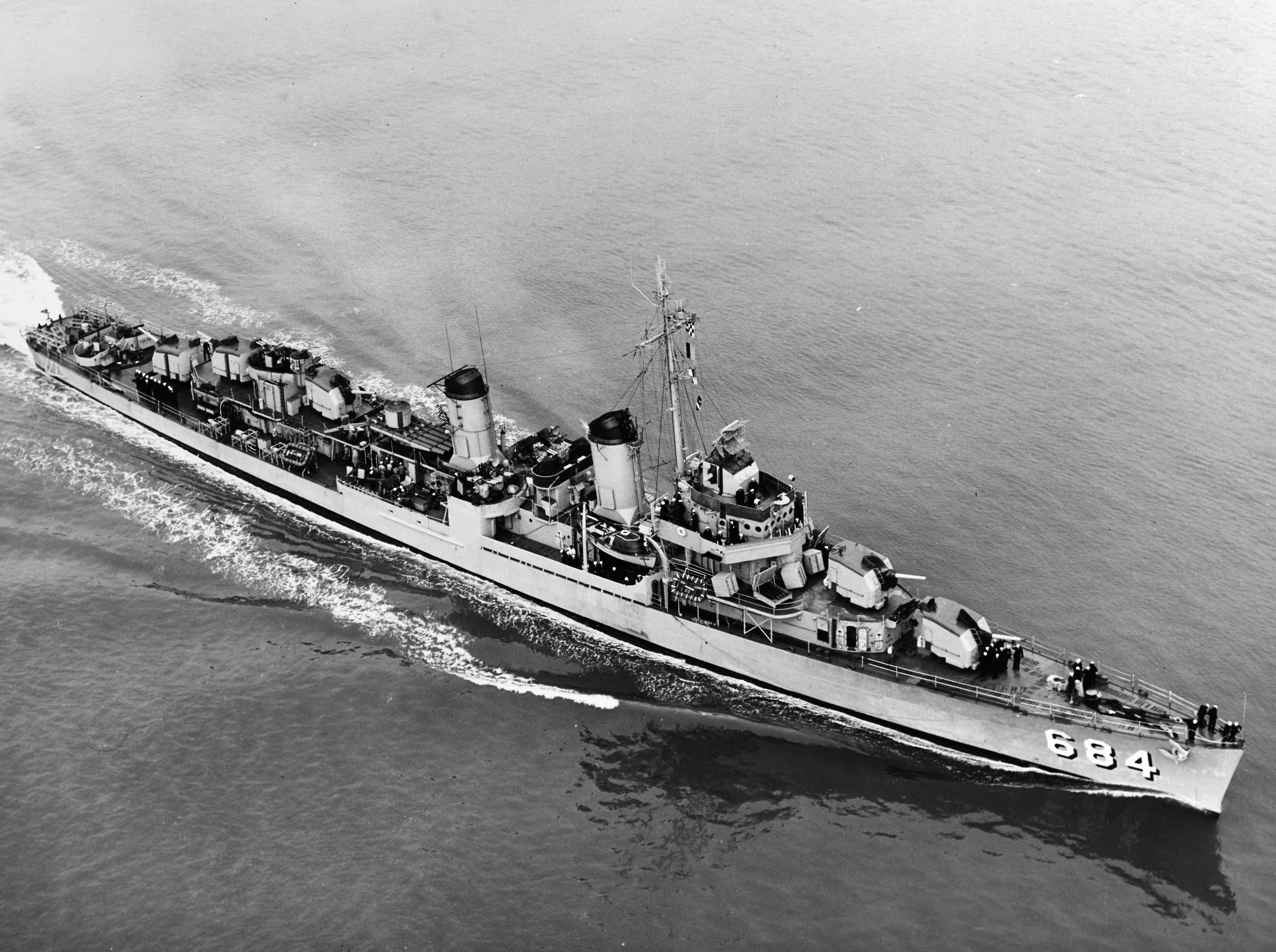
- USS Wedderburn (DD-684)

History

United States
- Namesake: Charles F. Wedderburn
- Builder: Bethlehem Shipbuilding Corporation, San Francisco, California
- Laid down: 10 January 1943
- Launched: 1 August 1943
- Commissioned: 9 March 1944
- Decommissioned: 1 October 1969
- Stricken: 1 October 1969
- Fate: Sold 25 January 1972 for scrapping

General characteristics
- Class & type: Fletcher-class destroyer
- Displacement: 2,050 tons
- Length: 376.4 ft (114.7 m)
- Beam: 39.6 ft (12.1 m)
- Draft: 13.8 ft (4.2 m)
- Propulsion: 60,000 shp (45 MW); 2 propellers
- Speed: 38 knots (70 km/h; 44 mph)
- Range: 6500 nmi (12,000 km) at 15 kt
- Complement: 329
- Armament: 5 × 5-inch 38 caliber guns; 10 × 40 mm AA guns; 7 × 20 mm AA guns; 10 × 21 in torpedo tubes

USS Wedderburn (DD-684), was a Fletcher-class destroyer of the United States Navy.

== Namesake ==
Charles Foster Wedderburn was born on 2 October 1892 in Chicago, Illinois. He was appointed a midshipman at the United States Naval Academy on 7 July 1911, he graduated and received his commission on 5 June 1915. Ensign Wedderburn served on the cruiser USS Brooklyn from graduation to the end of 1915. In December 1915, he transferred to the destroyer USS Chauncey assigned to the Asiatic Fleet and based at Cavite in the Philippines. He was promoted to Lieutenant (junior grade) on 1 July 1917; and, a month later, his ship departed Cavite with orders to the coast of France. Based at St. Nazaire, his ship escorted convoys in the eastern Atlantic. While on such a mission about 110 miles (180 km) west of Gibraltar, Chauncey was involved in a fatal collision with a British merchantman, SS Rose, on the night of 18–19 November. The destroyer sank at approximately 03:17 on the 19th taking Wedderburn and 20 of his comrades to their deaths.

== Construction and commissioning ==
Wedderburn (DD-684) was laid down on 10 January 1943 at San Francisco by the Bethlehem Steel Co.; launched on 1 August 1943; sponsored by Mrs. Gertrude F. Wedderburn; and commissioned on 9 March 1944.

== 1944 ==
Following shakedown training along the west coast and post-shakedown availability back at the Bethlehem Steel Co., Wedderburn departed San Francisco on 21 June in company with Fieberling (DE-640). The two warships arrived in Pearl Harbor six days later, and Wedderburn joined Task Unit (TU) 19.3.2 with which she served briefly on plane guard and anti-submarine duty. On 1 July, the destroyer continued her voyage west to Eniwetok in the Marshall Islands where she joined Task Force (TF) 53 for the second assault of the Marianas operation, the battle of Guam.

She stood out of Eniwetok on 17 July in company with Task Group (TG) 53.4, the Southern Transport Group. She arrived off Guam on 22 July, the day after the initial assault on that island and, for the next three weeks, performed yeoman service protecting the invasion fleet—upon which the battle ashore depended—from the threat of Japanese submarine attack. Her service in the Marianas ended on 10 August when she shaped a course back to Eniwetok.

Wedderburn reentered the lagoon at Eniwetok on 14 August. There, she was reassigned to the antisubmarine screen of a fast carrier task group, TG 38.2, built around Intrepid (CV-11), Hancock (CV-19), Bunker Hill (CV-17), Cabot (CVL-28), and Independence (CVL-22). She sailed from Eniwetok on 29 August in company with the entire fast carrier task force (TF 38) to conduct a major sweep of Japanese-held islands including the Philippines, the Palaus, and Yap Island. Wedderburn screened the carrier from enemy submarine attacks while they sent their planes against targets on Mindanao and Leyte and, later, the Visayas sub-group. They also provided initial aerial bombardment for the Palau invasion and for the Morotai operation. Those missions took up almost the entire month of September, and the destroyer did not enter a "port" until the 28th when TG 38.2 arrived at Saipan. On 1 October, she and TG 38.2 moved on to recently captured Ulithi where the ships arrived the next day. Wedderburn, however, soon returned to sea. Task Force 38 rendezvoused about 375 miles west of the Marianas on 7 October to open the preliminaries to the invasion of Leyte. Wedderburn continued her antisubmarine vigil while the carriers she protected launched their aircraft first against Okinawa, then Formosa, and finally Philippine targets, striking enemy air bases on Luzon and the Visayas to give the United States dominance in the air over Leyte when the invasion began on 20 October.

Wedderburn continued to guard the fast carriers while they operated off the northeastern shore of Luzon providing distant air support for the Leyte invasion. By the 24th, it had become apparent that the Japanese planned to dispute the landing with some variety of naval force. The result was the four-phase Battle for Leyte Gulf. That same day, planes from Wedderburn-protected carriers opened the battle striking at the enemy's Center Force, commanded by Vice Admiral Takeo Kurita—while it traversed the Sibuyan Sea toward the San Bernardino Strait. Late that evening, after having sunk battleship Musashi and damaged other Japanese ships, the fast carriers raced northward to take the bait offered by a force of almost plane-less aircraft carriers which Vice Admiral Jisaburo Ozawa was using as a decoy force. Thus, Wedderburn was far north when the Surigao Strait and Samar phases were fought on the night of 24–25 October and the morning of the 25th, respectively. Instead, she participated in the final phase of the battle, against Ozawa's force, though her role remained one of support for the carriers which she screened against submarine attack while she rescued their downed aviators.

After the Battle for Leyte Gulf, the destroyer continued to operate off Luzon with TG 38.2 while the carriers' planes provided additional air cover for the troops fighting to capture Leyte. That duty lasted until 5 November when engine trouble forced her to set a course for Ulithi. The warship arrived at that advanced base on 10 November, quickly completed repairs, and rejoined TG 38.2 off Luzon just after mid-month. Her return, however, proved brief; for, on 23 November, she received orders to return to Ulithi to join TG 38.1. At Ulithi, she conducted exercises until 10 December when she departed the atoll with TG 38.1 to support the landings on Mindoro. During that operation, TF 38 passed through the infamous typhoon of December 1944 which damaged many ships in the force and sank three. Wedderburn, however, suffered only minor damage and participated in the search for survivors of Hull (DD-350), Monaghan (DD-354), and Spence (DD-512) though she did not engage in any actual rescue operations. The damage caused by the typhoon necessitated a return to Ulithi for repairs. The destroyer and the other ships of TF 38 entered the lagoon on Christmas Eve and remained there six days, resuming operations on 30 December 1944.

== 1945 ==
The return to sea brought TF 38 into active participation in support of the Luzon invasion at Lingayen. The fast carriers sought to keep Japanese reinforcements—airborne, naval, and land—from entering the fray against the invading forces by keeping enemy air-power grounded and by sinking as much of his shipping as possible. Thus, Wedderburn resumed her role as guardian of the carriers while their planes made up the offensive arm of the Third Fleet. On 3 and 4 January 1945, fast carrier aircraft hit air installations and shipping at Formosa and Okinawa. They went after targets on Luzon itself on the 6th and 7th and, on the 9th, the day of the initial landings, returned to Formosa for air suppression duty while troops were going ashore. Following that assignment, she moved through Bashi Channel with TF 38 for two weeks of air raids on Japanese-held southern China and French Indochina which included an anti-shipping sweep of the South China Sea. On the return voyage, TF 38 planes struck at the Nansei Shoto, a group of islands near Okinawa, on the 21st and 22d before reentering Ulithi Lagoon on the 25th.

Soon thereafter, the Third Fleet became the Fifth Fleet when Admiral Raymond A. Spruance relieved Admiral William F. Halsey. The change in designation reflected the change of command only, and all else remained substantially as it was. Wedderburn continued to provide antisubmarine protection for her task group, redesignated TG 58.2. Early on 10 February, the fast carriers again stood out of Ulithi to provide air support for the assault on Iwo Jima in the Volcano Islands. On 16 February, they launched planes for a strike against air installations around Tokyo, the first air raid on the Japanese capital since 1942 when the Fast Carrier Task Force commander, Vice Admiral Marc A. Mitscher—then captain of Hornet (CV-8)—launched Lieutenant Colonel James Doolittle's B-25 bombers on their famous raid. During the current two-day attack, the American planes made 138 sorties in which their pilots claimed to have sunk three picket boats and an escort carrier as well as to have destroyed over 700 enemy aircraft. Following the raid, Wedderburn escorted the carriers south to Iwo Jima where she participated in shore bombardments and patrolled against submarines in TF 51's transport area. On 23 February, she departed Iwo Jima and rejoined TG 58.2 as it headed off north with the rest of TF 58 for another round of strikes on the Japanese home islands. Foul weather, however, forced the cancellation of those strikes; and, after a refueling rendezvous, the carriers and their escorts reentered the lagoon at Ulithi on 4 March.

After 10 days of refueling, rearming, and repairing, TF 58 left Ulithi and shaped a course for Japan. Their first targets were the airfields on Kyūshū, located within striking range of Okinawa, the 5th Fleet's next objective. The carriers launched planes on 18 March, but the enemy struck back with fighters, bombers, and kamikazes. In the ensuing battle, near misses damaged Enterprise (CV-6), Yorktown (CV-10), and Intrepid (CV-11). The next day, Franklin (CV-13) received a direct bomb hit; and the enemy scored one on Wasp (CV-18) as well. However, on a more positive side, Wedderburn gunners claimed two of the attacking enemy planes. After TF 58 sustained the damage of 18 and 19 March, it was reorganized somewhat. Wedderburn's TG 58.2 became a task group made up of damaged carriers Enterprise, Franklin, and Wasp, and gave up a number of its screening units to the similarly reformed TG 58.1.

Wedderburn was one of those escorts so reassigned and consequently remained with TF 58 while the task group of cripples retired to base. She continued to screen the carriers as they launched air strikes on Okinawa during the last week in March and the week following the 1 April landings. Throughout the entire period, the Japanese launched air attacks at them incessantly.

It was not until the 6th, however, that sighting reports made it apparent that the enemy planned a suicidal surface attack with the remnants of their fleet. Superbattleship Yamato, screened by a cruiser and eight destroyers, started south to contest the landings. The fast carriers continued to steam on station off Okinawa protected by Wedderburn and her colleagues but, on 7 April, launched a series of search and attack sorties which ultimately sent the mighty Japanese battleship to the bottom along with light cruiser Yahagi and four of the escorting destroyers.

After that scrape, TF 58 concentrated its efforts on supporting the troops ashore and defending itself and the invasion force from the final onslaught of Japanese air power. Wedderburn remained in the vicinity of the Ryukyu Islands for another 20 days until TG 58.1 headed for Ulithi on 27 April. On 18 May, the destroyer departed Ulithi to escort Missouri (BB-63) to Guam to pick up Admiral William F. Halsey who was scheduled to take command of the naval forces off Okinawa later that month. She then escorted Missouri back to the Ryukyus and reentered the fray at Okinawa at the beginning of the final week of May.

Halsey took over from Admiral Raymond Spruance on 27 May; and—now that Admiral Halsey was back in overall command—Wedderburn and her associates became units of the 3d Fleet rather than of the 5th Fleet. For the remainder of World War II, she screened various task groups of TF 38 first while they continued support for the Okinawa operation and, later that summer, when they went on their final rampage in the Japanese home islands. The Japanese capitulation on 15 August found her in the screen of TG 38.4 while the carriers were preparing for yet another air strike—one which they did not launch.

Immediately following the war, the destroyer served with the occupation forces around Tokyo Bay, escorting Japanese merchant ships, supervising mine-clearing operations, and making hydrographic surveys. On 31 October, she shaped a course back to the United States. After a stop at Pearl Harbor from 9 to 13 November, she resumed her voyage and arrived at the Puget Sound Naval Shipyard on 19 November. Following repairs at Puget Sound, she was placed out of commission in March 1946 and was berthed at San Diego.

== 1950 – 1953 ==
In August 1946, she returned to semi-activity when she began training naval reservists, until 21 November 1950 when she was recommissioned.

The newly recommissioned destroyer joined the Pacific Fleet Destroyer Force in January 1951; completed her reactivation work at Hunters Point Naval Shipyard; and, in May, finished underway training. On 18 June, she departed the west coast for her first tour of duty in the Korean War. Though assigned operationally to the Blockading and Escort Force (TF 95), she also served periodically as a plane guard for the fast carriers of TF 77 as well as on the Taiwan Strait patrol (TF 72). For the most part, though, her duties consisted of blockading the coastline of Korea and providing gunfire support for the United Nations troops operating ashore. She concluded her first tour of duty in the Far East with the Taiwan Strait patrol and returned to the United States in February 1952.

After an overhaul at the San Francisco Naval Shipyard and several weeks of training, the warship headed back to Korea in August 1952. Once again, she divided her time between blockading and gunfire support missions along the Korean coast and escort duty with the fast carriers as well as short periods with the Taiwan Strait patrol. Wedderburn concluded her second Korean War deployment and returned to San Diego in March 1953.

During the next seven months, the destroyer conducted normal west coast operations out of San Diego. The Korean War ended with the armistice of 27 July 1953 right near the midpoint of Wedderburn's seven months of 1st Fleet operations. When she returned to the Far East in October, she began the first essentially peacetime deployment of her career.

== 1954 – 1964 ==
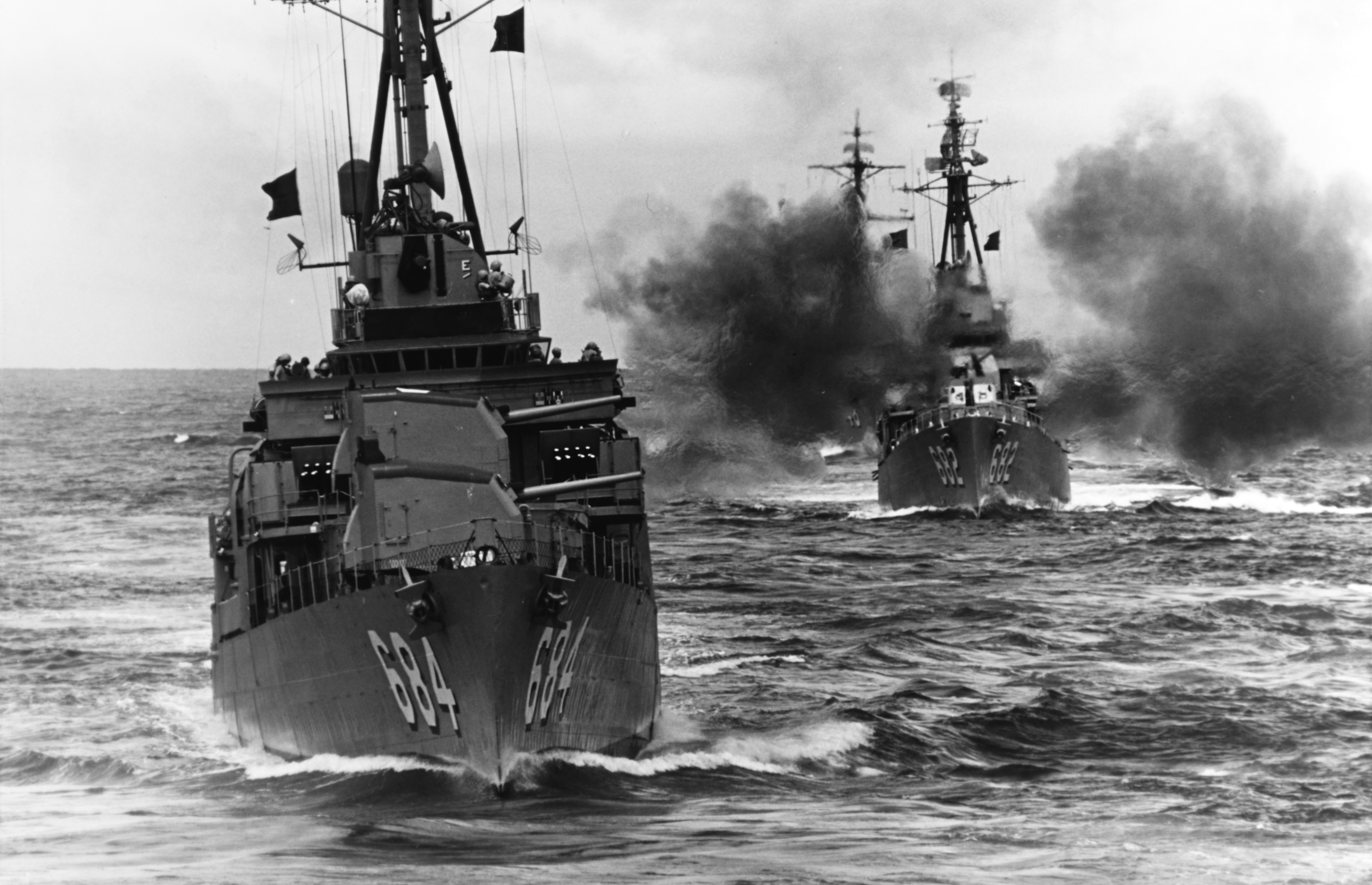
USS Wedderburn (DD-684) firing her 5 in (130 mm) guns at a target drone aircraft, during exercises, 21 August 1964.

In the decade between 1954 and 1964, the warship continued to alternate deployments to the western Pacific with tours of duty along the coast of southern California. For the most part, the seven tours she made to the Far East consisted of port visits and training exercises. During the 1958 deployment, she visited Sydney, Australia, in addition to her usual ports of call farther north and participated in the multinational SEATO exercise, Operation Ocean Link. That deployment also saw her on patrol in the Taiwan Strait during the American show of force over the Quemoy and Matsu bombardment by the Chinese communists. The remainder of her deployments were more routine in nature consisting of plane guard duty with TF 77, port visits, training exercises, and periods of time with the Taiwan Strait patrol. When not in the Orient, she conducted type training, upkeep, and periodic overhauls on the west coast.

The warship departed San Diego on 5 August 1964 to begin her 11th deployment to the Far East. Four days before, the Gulf of Tonkin incident occurred, signaling a stepped-up American involvement in the strife in South Vietnam. That involvement dictated the nature of Wedderburn's 7th Fleet assignments for the remainder of her active career. During the fall of 1964, she operated off the Vietnamese coast as plane guard and escort for TF 77, duplicating her service during World War II and the Korean War. She departed the newly established combat zone in November for a SEATO weapons demonstration and then put into Subic Bay in the Philippines for upkeep.

== 1965 – 1969 ==
After Christmas liberty at Yokosuka, Japan, she returned to active operations in the South China Sea in January 1965. At the conclusion of that duty, late in the month, she set course for home, arriving in San Diego on 6 February. She spent the remainder of 1965 in the eastern Pacific. After a month of post-deployment stand-down followed by four weeks of local operations out of San Diego, she entered the Long Beach Naval Shipyard for a month-long availability. In June and July, she embarked NROTC midshipmen for their summer cruise, during which she visited San Francisco and the islands of Kauai and Oahu in Hawaii. Returning to San Diego on 4 August, the warship conducted three weeks of repairs and then resumed training operations which continued until she began preparations for another Far Eastern cruise in November.

On 7 January 1966, Wedderburn departed San Diego in company with Worden (DLG-18), Richard B. Anderson (DD-786), and Bausell (DD-845). After stops at Oahu, Midway, and Guam, she arrived in Subic Bay on 28 January. On 1 February, she headed for the South China Sea where she became a unit of TG 77.5 and served as escort and plane guard for the carriers until 28 February. Following a brief return to Subic Bay, she visited Sasebo, Japan, and Okinawa early in March. She returned to the Vietnam combat zone on 12 March as a unit of TG 77.7 and again served as escort and plane guard for carriers conducting air strikes in North Vietnam. She continued in that role until 2 April when she was detached and reassigned to Task Unit (TU) 70.8.9 to conduct gunfire support missions near Danang and Quang Tri. On the 6th, the warship resumed her former assignment with TG 77.7. On 24 April, she joined a different unit, TU 77.0.3, to conduct trawler surveillance in the Gulf of Tonkin. On 2 May, she returned to gunfire support duty, this time near Chu Lai, until 8 May. On that day, the destroyer resumed duty with TF 77 as a search and rescue (SAR) vessel on the southern SAR station. On 15 May, she concluded her last combat assignment of the 1966 deployment. After a week's liberty call at Hong Kong and repairs at Yokosuka, Wedderburn headed home on 3 June and arrived in San Diego 10 days later. Following local operations, the destroyer entered the Long Beach Naval Shipyard on 11 August for a three-month overhaul. She completed sea trials on 20 November and resumed normal operations on the 21st.

During the first two months of 1967, Wedderburn conducted extensive refresher training exercises and, during March and early April, made preparations for overseas movement. On 8 April, she stood out of San Diego once more in company with Worden, Brush (DD-745), and Lyman K. Swenson (DD-729). She stopped at Pearl Harbor from 14 to 17 April and arrived in Yokosuka on the 27th. Three days later, she got underway for Okinawa whence she continued on to Yankee Station in the Gulf of Tonkin where she conducted plane guard duty with TG 77.6. Five days later, she shifted to shore bombardment duty near the demilitarized zone (DMZ). That assignment lasted until 27 May when she returned to the carriers on Yankee Station. She left the combat zone on 5 June and arrived in Subic Bay two days later.

She made repairs and embarked two NROTC midshipmen and then departed the Philippines on 10 June to return to the Gulf of Tonkin. There, she divided her time between plane guard duty for Hancock (CVA-19) and ASW exercises with Bronstein (DE-1037) and Catfish (SS-339). She visited Kaohsiung, Taiwan, from 25 June to 10 July and underwent repairs alongside Delta (AR-9). On her return to the coast of Vietnam, she rejoined TU 70.8.9 for a series of gunfire support missions in the I Corps zone of operations. Her guns helped the marines ashore complete Operation Bear Chain, an amphibious assault by Special Landing Force "Bravo" near Quang Tri City. On 21 July, she headed back to Subic Bay for a week of repairs and upkeep.

She did not return to the Vietnamese coast for a month due to repairs to her evaporator system. However, on 20 August, she headed back to the combat zone where, on the 22d, she resumed gunfire support duty for troops in the II Corps zone. Relieved by Eaton (DD-510) on 26 August, she rejoined TF 77 in the Gulf of Tonkin and served as escort for the carriers until 3 September. She departed the Gulf of Tonkin late on the 3d and shaped a course for Okinawa, arriving there on the 7th. From there, she moved on to Yokosuka for a 10-day layover before getting underway for home on the 21st. Wedderburn reached San Diego on 6 October and began the normal post-deployment stand-down. In mid-November, she resumed normal operations in the southern California operating area. That routine continued until she began repairs at Long Beach on 19 April 1968. She returned to San Diego on 24 May and resumed normal operations out of her home port.

Wedderburn embarked upon the final western Pacific deployment of her career on 30 September. Steaming in company with Hornet (CVS-12), she stopped at Oahu for nine days in mid-October and then continued her voyage to Yokosuka, where she arrived on the 27th. On the 30th, she accompanied Hornet out of Yokosuka, and together, they laid course for the Tonkin Gulf. They arrived in the gulf on 3 November; but, two days later, Wedderburn became an escort for Constellation (CVA-64) for two days. After that, she rejoined her old colleague, Hancock. On 17 November, a recurring sonar problem forced the destroyer to head for Subic Bay, where she remained until 9 December. She returned to duty in the Tonkin Gulf on 11 December but remained on station only until the 31st when steam leaks forced her back to Subic Bay.

She completed repairs late in January 1969 and returned to the combat zone soon thereafter. The warship remained on station, dividing her time between gunfire support, carrier escort, and Soviet trawler surveillance, until mid-March. After a brief return to Subic Bay, she began her final tour of duty on the gunline on 22 March. Wedderburn served as a gunfire support ship for about a month before beginning her homeward voyage on 20 April. En route, she made stops at Yokosuka, Japan, and Buckner Bay, Okinawa; and arrived back in San Diego on 12 May. She remained in port throughout the summer of 1969 due to a casualty to her propulsion plant and, in September, received word that she was going to be decommissioned.

On 1 October 1969, Wedderburn was placed out of commission at San Diego, and her name was struck from the Navy list. On 25 January 1972, she was sold to Dhon's Iron & Steel Co., Ltd., for scrapping.

Wedderburn earned seven battle stars for World War II service, four battle stars for Korean War service, and six battle stars for service in the Vietnam War.
