= Frank Jack Fletcher =

USN admiral, Medal of Honor recipient (1885–1973)

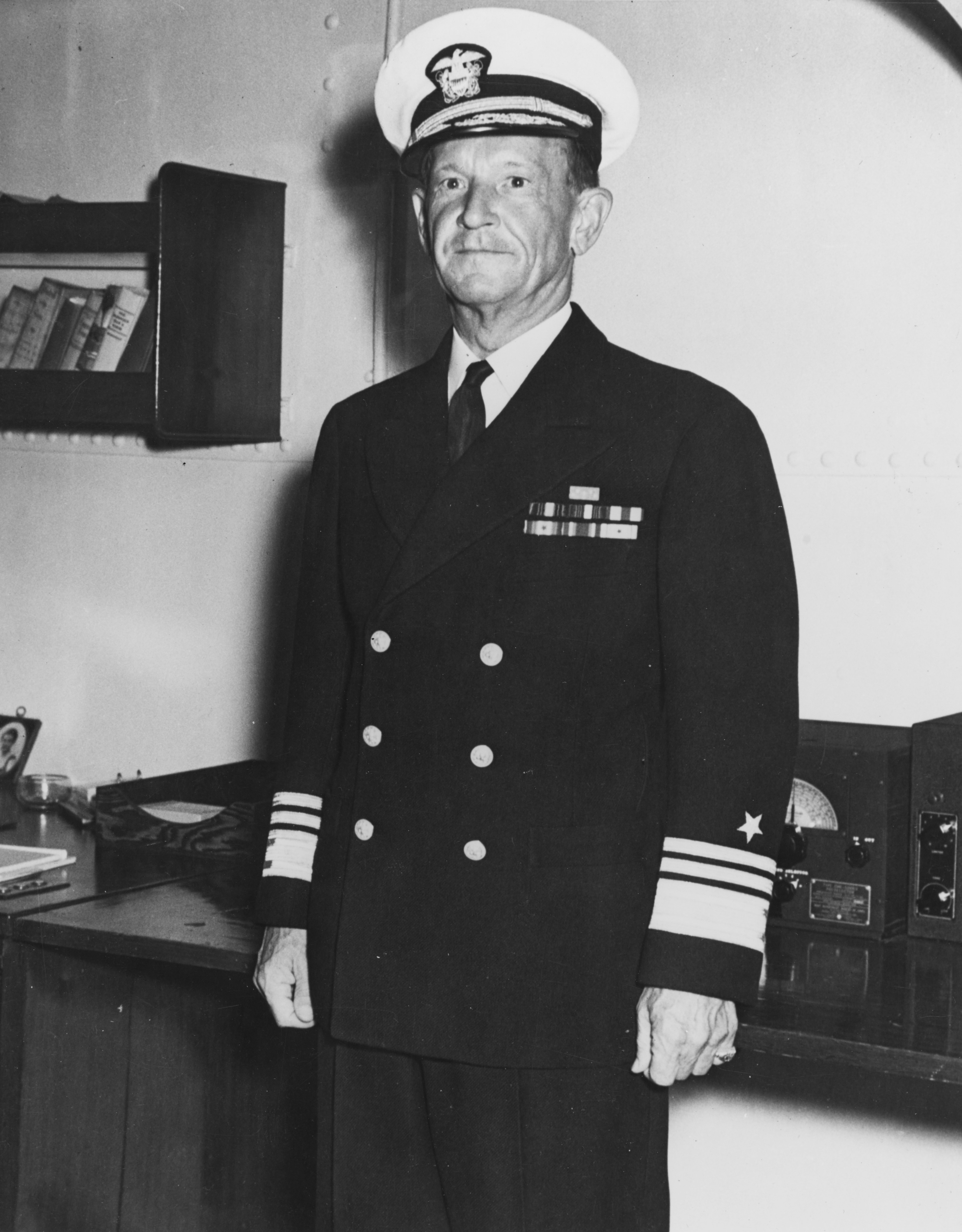
- Fletcher in 1942
- Born: April 29, 1885; Marshalltown, Iowa, US
- Died: April 25, 1973 (aged 87); Bethesda, Maryland, US
- Burial place: Arlington National Cemetery
- Relatives: Admiral Frank Friday Fletcher (uncle)
- Military career
- Allegiance: United States
- Branch: United States Navy
- Service years: 1906–1947
- Rank: Admiral
- Nickname: Black Jack
- Commands: Dale; Chauncey; Margaret; Benham; Gridley; Whipple; Sacramento; Rainbow; Submarine Base, Cavite; New Mexico; Cruiser Division THREE; Cruiser Division SIX; Cruisers, Scouting Force; Cruiser Division FOUR; Cruisers, Pacific Fleet; Task Force 17 (Battles of Coral Sea and Midway); Task Force 61; Task Force 11 (Battle of the Eastern Solomons); Thirteenth Naval District; Northwest Sea Frontier; Alaskan Sea Frontier / Task Force 91; North Pacific Force; North Pacific Ocean Area; Task Force 90
- Conflicts: Philippine–American War; Banana Wars; Occupation of Veracruz; World War I; Battle of the Atlantic; World War II; Battle of the Coral Sea; Battle of Midway; Guadalcanal campaign; Battle of Tulagi and Gavutu-Tanambogo; Battle of the Eastern Solomons; Japan campaign
- Awards: Medal of Honor; Navy Cross; Navy Distinguished Service Medal; Army Distinguished Service Medal; Purple Heart

Frank Jack Fletcher (April 29, 1885 – April 25, 1973) was an admiral in the United States Navy during World War II. Fletcher commanded five different task forces through the war; he was the operational task force commander at the pivotal battles of the Coral Sea and Midway, which collectively resulted in the sinking of five Japanese aircraft carriers.

In 1914, then Lieutenant Fletcher was awarded the Medal of Honor for his actions in the battle at Veracruz. He was the nephew of Admiral Frank Friday Fletcher, who was also awarded the Medal of Honor for actions at Veracruz.

== Early life and early Navy career ==
Fletcher was born in Marshalltown, Iowa, on April 29, 1885, to Thomas Fletcher and Alice Fletcher née Glick, the daughter of a German immigrant pioneer.

Appointed to the US Naval Academy in 1902, he graduated on February 12, 1906, served two years at sea as required by law at the time, and was commissioned as an ensign on February 13, 1908.

Following graduation from the Naval Academy, he served on the battleships Rhode Island and Ohio, operating in the Atlantic. After a year in the yacht-turned-gunboat Eagle on special service, he reported to the battleship Maine, of the Atlantic Fleet, in December 1908. In August 1909, he was assigned to the screw frigate Franklin, his duty drafting men for the Pacific Fleet and transporting them on board the armored cruiser Tennessee to Cavite in the Philippines.

In November 1909, he was assigned to the destroyer Chauncey, operating as part of the Asiatic Torpedo Flotilla. Fletcher assumed command of the destroyer Dale in April 1910, and in March 1912, he returned to Chauncey as her commanding officer. In December 1912, he was transferred to the battleship Florida. In April 1914, he was aboard Florida, the flagship of his uncle Frank Friday Fletcher, during the occupation of Veracruz, Mexico. He was awarded the Medal of Honor for the rescue of refugees on the transport Esperanza.

Detached from Florida in July 1914, he served briefly in Tennessee before reporting as aide and flag lieutenant on the staff of the Commander in Chief, US Atlantic Fleet in July 1914. After a year at this post, he returned to the Naval Academy for duty in the Executive Department.

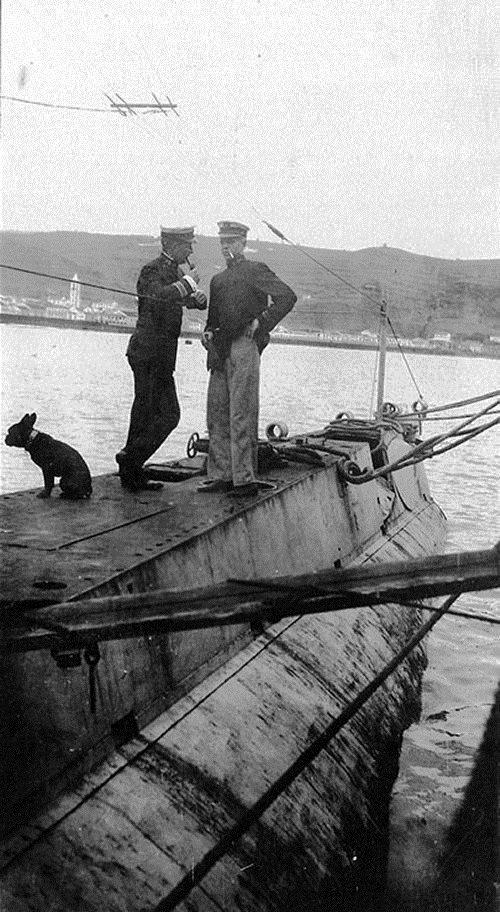
Jack Fletcher (at left) and his French Bulldog "Bueil" talking with the commanding officer of the submarine K-6, Azores, December 1917

== World War I and interwar service ==
Following the outbreak of World War I, he served as gunnery officer of the battleship Kearsarge until September 1917, after which he assumed command of yacht-turned-patrol vessel Margaret. He was assigned to the destroyer Allen in February 1918. He took command of the destroyer Benham in May 1918, receiving the Navy Cross for leading her through "important, exacting and hazardous duty".

From October 1918 to February 1919, he assisted in fitting out the destroyer Crane, but was detached before her commissioning. He then had similar duty with the destroyer Gridley, and upon her commissioning on March 8, 1919, assumed command. He was relieved of that command in April 1919.

Returning to Washington, he was head of the Detail Section, Enlisted Personnel Division in the Bureau of Navigation until September 1922.

He returned to the Asiatic Station, having consecutive command of the destroyer Whipple, the gunboat Sacramento, the submarine tender Rainbow, and the submarine base at Cavite. Returning to the United States, he served at the Washington Navy Yard from March 1925 to 1927; became executive officer of the battleship Colorado; and completed the Senior Course at the Naval War College, Newport in 1929–30, followed immediately by the Army War College in Washington, D.C., 1930–31, in preparation for strategic leadership responsibilities.

Fletcher became chief of staff to the Commander in Chief, US Asiatic Fleet in August 1931. In the summer of 1933, he was transferred to the Office of the Chief of Naval Operations. Following this assignment, he served from November 1933 to May 1936, as aide to the Secretary of the Navy, the Honorable Claude A. Swanson.

He assumed command of the battleship USS New Mexico, flagship of Battleship Division Three, in June 1936. In December 1937, he became a member of the Naval Examining Board, and became Assistant Chief of Bureau of Navigation in June 1938. In November 1939, Fletcher was promoted to Flag Rank, Rear Admiral, and Commander Cruiser Division Three (Light Cruisers). In June 1940, Rear Admiral Fletcher was placed in command of Cruiser Division Six (Heavy Cruisers), the position he held on December 7, 1941. Fletcher was scheduled to become Commander, Cruisers, Scouting Force, in administrative charge of all heavy cruisers, but the events of December 7 changed those plans.

== World War II ==
=== Pearl Harbor ===
RAdm Fletcher was serving as Commander Cruiser Division Six and at sea when the Japanese attacked Pearl Harbor on December 7, 1941. Admiral Kimmel, Commander in Chief, United States Pacific Fleet (CinC PAC), thought enough of Fletcher to put his name third on a short list of potential successors, if necessary. According to Rear Admiral Thomas Kincaid, although Fletcher was scheduled to become Commander, of Cruisers, Scouting Force, Admiral Kimmel postponed this change in order to place Fletcher in command of the Wake Island relief task force.

=== Wake Island: December 8–23, 1941 ===
Prior to December 7, Wake Island had received reinforcements, including aircraft for defense. At the time of Pearl Harbor, it was under the command of Commander Winfield Scott Cunningham and included a Marine Corps Defense Battalion, commanded by Major James Devereux. A day after Pearl Harbor, reports were received from Wake Island of a Japanese bombardment and subsequent invasion attempt. Kimmel expected Wake Island to hold out in the short run and on December 10, drafted an Operations Order for the relief of Wake. On December 15, Kimmel placed Fletcher in command of Task Force (TF) 14 for the relief of Wake, which consisted of the fleet carrier Saratoga, the fleet oiler Neches, the seaplane tender Tangier, three heavy cruisers (Astoria, Minneapolis, San Francisco), and eight destroyers: (Selfridge, Mugford, Jarvis, Patterson, Ralph Talbot, Henley, Blue, Helm). Fletcher commanded the task force from the cruiser Astoria, while Rear Admiral Aubrey Fitch sailed aboard Saratoga. Events caused a delay in the departure of TF 14, as well as a delay in D-Day, the date of the actual relief effort. TF 14 sailed west towards Wake Island at less than 13 knots, as fast as the slowest ship could travel, with plans to arrive at Wake Island on December 24 (D-Day). Fletcher had been instructed to fuel prior to arriving at Wake Island. Underway refueling was still a work in progress which took time and required calm sea conditions.

However, certain events took place that had a drastic impact on the relief effort. The primary event was the relief of Kimmel as CinC PAC by Admiral Chester Nimitz. Since Nimitz was in Washington, D.C., Vice Admiral William Pye assumed the duties of CinC PAC on December 17, until Nimitz's arrival. Pye brought in personnel from his staff (he commanded the Pacific Fleet battleships), and debates began regarding the intelligence information being provided, primarily whether the Japanese Navy had moved aircraft carriers to Wake in support of their invasion. On December 22, the Japanese began another invasion attempt of Wake. Given the new assault and a lack of understanding regarding the disposition of Japanese naval forces in the area, Pye ordered TF 14 to return to Pearl Harbor on December 22, abandoning the relief effort. On the return trip, the equipment loaded on Tangier was delivered to Midway Island.

=== January–April 1942 ===
On January 1, 1942, Fletcher took command of Task Force 17, built around the carrier Yorktown. Although a surface fleet admiral, he was chosen over more senior officers to lead the carrier task force. He learned air operations on the job while escorting troops to the South Pacific. He was the junior TF commander under the tutelage of the experts: Vice Admiral William Halsey during the Marshalls-Gilberts raids in February; Vice Admiral Wilson Brown attacking the enemy landings on New Guinea in March; and he had aviation expert Rear Admiral Aubrey Fitch with him during the first Battle of the Coral Sea.

On April 19, 1942, Fletcher was designated Commander Cruisers, Pacific Fleet, with additional duty as Commander Cruiser Division Four.

=== Coral Sea: May 4–8, 1942 ===
In May 1942, Fletcher commanded the task forces during the Battle of the Coral Sea. This was the first carrier-on-carrier battle fought between fleets that never came within sight of each other. Fletcher with the aircraft carrier Yorktown, Task Force 17, had been patrolling the Coral Sea and rendezvoused with Rear Admiral Aubrey Fitch with the aircraft carrier Lexington, Task Force 11, and a tanker group. Fletcher finished refueling first and headed west. On hearing the enemy was occupying Tulagi, Task Force 17 attacked the landing beaches, sinking several small ships before rejoining Lexington and an Australian cruiser force under Rear Admiral John Gregory Crace on May 5.

The next day, intelligence reported a Japanese invasion task force headed for Port Moresby, New Guinea, and a carrier strike force was in the area. The morning of May 7, Fletcher sent the Australian cruisers to stop the transports while he sought the carriers. His combat pilots sank the Japanese aircraft carrier Shōhō, escorting the enemy troop ships—"Scratch one flat top." radioed Lieutenant Commander Robert E. Dixon flying back to Lexington. That same day, Japanese carrier planes of Rear Admiral Chuichi Hara found the American tanker Neosho. Believing they had found a carrier, they severely damaged her after several all-out attacks, and sank her escorting destroyer, Sims; on May 11, the destroyer Henley located her, rescued the surviving crew, and sank her with naval gunfire.

On May 8, at first light, "round three opened." Fletcher launched 75 aircraft, Hara 69. Fitch had greater experience in handling air operations, and Fletcher delegated him that function, as he was to do again later with Noyes at Guadalcanal. The aircraft carrier Shōkaku was hit, but not damaged below the waterline; it sailed away. Another carrier, Zuikaku, had earlier dodged under a squall. The Japanese attack put two torpedoes into Lexington, which was abandoned that evening. Yorktown was hit near her island, but survived. Hara failed to use Zuikaku to achieve victory and withdrew. Now without air cover, the invasion fleet also withdrew, aborting the Port Moresby invasion.

Fletcher had achieved the objective of the mission at the cost of a carrier, a tanker, and a destroyer. In addition, his Grumman F4F Wildcats had beaten Japanese air groups 52 to 35, and had damaged Shōkaku; neither Japanese carrier would be able to join the fight at Midway the following month. This was the first World War II battle in which the Imperial Japanese Navy had been stopped. In battles at Pearl Harbor, the East Indies, Australia, and Ceylon, they had defeated the British, Dutch, and Asiatic Fleets, and had not lost a fleet ship larger than a minesweeper or submarine.

=== Midway: June 4–7, 1942 ===
In June 1942, Fletcher was the officer in tactical command at the Battle of Midway with two task forces, his usual Task Force 17—with a quickly repaired Yorktown—plus Task Force 16, with Enterprise and Hornet. Vice Admiral William Halsey normally commanded this task force, but had become ill and was replaced by Rear Admiral Raymond A. Spruance. When aircraft from four Japanese carriers attacked Midway Island, the three American carriers—warned by cracked Japanese codes and waiting in ambush—attacked and sank three enemy carriers: Akagi, Kaga, and Sōryū.

Enterprise and Hornet lost 70 aircraft. Japanese attacks on June 4 severely damaged Yorktown; repairs returned her to the battle until she was hopelessly disabled by a new round of attacks two hours later. Fletcher's scouts found the fourth enemy carrier, Hiryū, and Enterprise, with Yorktown planes, then sank it. At dusk, Fletcher released Spruance to continue fighting with Task Force 16 the next day. During the next two days, Spruance found two damaged cruisers and sank one. The enemy transport and battle fleets retreated.

A Japanese submarine, I-168, found the crippled Yorktown, under tow, on June 5 and sank her along with an escorting destroyer, Hammann. Japan had had seven large carriers—six at the time of the Pearl Harbor attack and one new construction. Four were sunk at Midway. This did not win the war, but evened the odds between Japanese and American fleet carriers. Following the battle, Fletcher was promoted to vice admiral and continued to command a carrier group at sea, after shifting his flag to the carrier Saratoga.

=== Landing at Guadalcanal: August 7–9, 1942 ===
As the United States took the offensive in August 1942, Vice Admiral Fletcher commanded Task Force 61 during the invasion of Tulagi and Guadalcanal by the 1st Marine Division. Carrier close air support was provided at Tulagi. The invasion of Guadalcanal was uncontested on the beach. Fletcher requested permission from Admiral Robert L. Ghormley, the overall commander, to withdraw his carriers from the dangerous waters when they were no longer needed, claiming that his aircraft losses and fuel state due to maneuvering required him to leave. Fletcher thought that the few American carriers should not be risked against multi-engine, land-based, torpedo bombers, when they were needed for combat against enemy carriers. Fletcher chose to withdraw on the evening of August 8, leaving light forces and many transport ships unprotected from the inevitable Japanese counterattack.

The Battle of Savo Island occurred in early morning of August 9, 1942. Allied warships screening the transports were surprised at midnight and defeated in 32 minutes by a Japanese force of seven cruisers and one destroyer, commanded by Japanese Vice Admiral Gunichi Mikawa. One Australian and three American heavy cruisers were sunk, and another American cruiser and two destroyers were damaged in this lopsided Japanese victory. As Crutchley notes, the transports were not touched. Fletcher is sometimes criticized because his carriers were at the far end of their nightly withdrawal, steaming back for the morning, yet too far away to seek revenge.

Rear Admiral Richmond K. Turner's offloading of supplies did not go as well as expected because of Japanese air raids. He had to withdraw the transports on the evening of August 9, after Fletcher left and most of his cruisers were sunk, over the strenuous objections of the ground commander, Marine General Alexander Vandegrift. The Marines refer to this as the "Navy Bugout", because the reserve Marine regiment and the division's 155 mm (6.1 in) heavy artillery, much of its ammunition and also most of its medical supplies and rations had yet to be unloaded. The Navy's withdrawal left the Marines ashore initially completely unprotected against Japanese land-based air raids from Rabaul and from nightly shelling by Imperial Japanese Navy cruisers and battleships that came down the "Slot" from their large naval and air base at Rabaul.

=== East Solomons: August 24–25, 1942 ===
Fletcher fought a superior Japanese fleet intent on counter-invasion in the aircraft carrier Battle of the Eastern Solomons. He initiated the engagement, and the force under his command sank the carrier Ryūjō. The ensuing battle was essentially a giant aerial dogfight interspersed with shipborne anti-aircraft fire. The United States lost 20 aircraft; the Japanese lost 70. Enterprise was hit by three bombs; the Japanese seaplane tender Chitose was nearly sunk, but survived. The enemy withdrew without landing troops on Guadalcanal and had to resort to the Tokyo Express: the overnight delivery of a few hundred troops and supplies by destroyers.

Fletcher was criticized by the Chief of Naval Operations, Admiral Ernest King, for not pursuing the Combined Fleet as it withdrew. This criticism may have affected the decision to not return Fletcher to his command after his flagship carrier, Saratoga, was torpedoed and damaged by a Japanese submarine on August 31, 1942. Fletcher himself suffered a gash to his head in the attack, for which he received the Purple Heart. He was relieved of command, sent on leave (his first leave after eight months of continuous combat), and subsequently sent to Alaska.

=== Northern Pacific ===
From November 1942 – 1945, Fletcher commanded naval forces in the North Pacific from the Alaskan island of Adak. In November 1942, he became commandant of Thirteenth Naval District and commander of Northwestern Sea Frontier. He was relieved as commandant in October 1943, but continued to serve as commander Northwestern Sea Frontier until April 15, 1944, when the Northwestern Sea Frontier was abolished and the Alaskan Sea Frontier established. He then became Commander of the latter, with additional duty as Commander North Pacific Force and North Pacific Ocean Area. It was revealed in July 1945 that Task Force 90, under his overall command, had made the first penetration through the Kurile Islands in the Sea of Okhotsk on March 3 and 4, 1945, and the same task force on February 4, 1945, bombarded Paramushir in the first sea bombardment of the Kurile.

== Postwar and final days ==
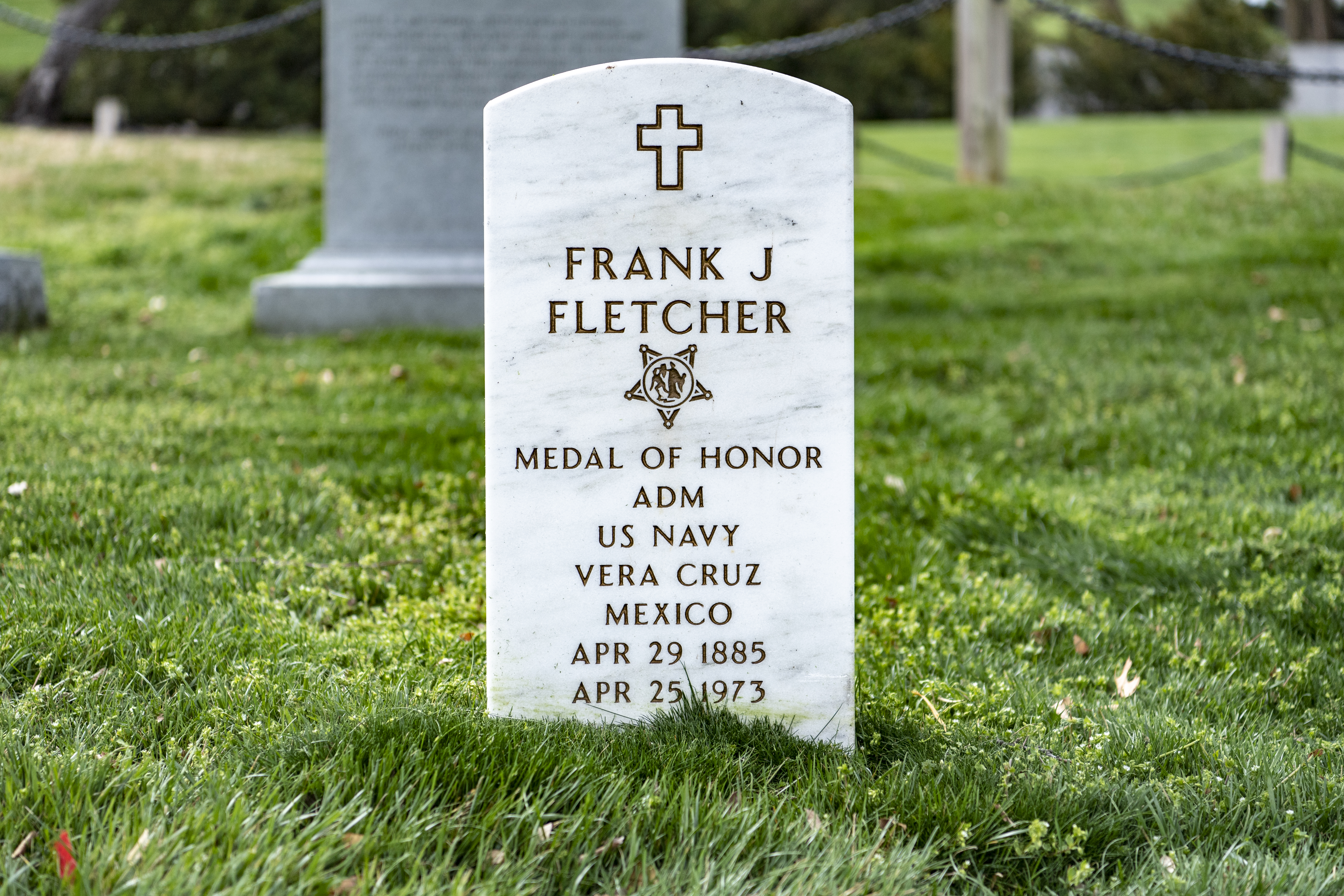
Grave at Arlington National Cemetery (March 2020)

In September 1945, following the cessation of hostilities in the Far East, he proceeded to Ōminato, Japan, with the North Pacific Force (consisting of about sixty vessels) for the emergency naval occupation of Northern Japan. He remained there until ordered to return to the United States, and on December 17, 1945, was appointed to the Navy's General Board. On May 1, 1946, as Senior Member of that Board he became Chairman, and continued to serve in that capacity until relieved of all active duty for his retirement on May 1, 1947, with the rank of full admiral. He retired to his country estate, Araby, in Maryland. Many of Fletcher's papers were lost in combat. He declined to reconstruct them from Pentagon archives or to be interviewed by Samuel Eliot Morison, who was writing the History of United States Naval Operations in World War II. In return, he received no consideration by Morison, an attitude picked up by later authors. At least one author felt Fletcher did not get enough credit for forces under his command sinking six Japanese carriers.

Fletcher died on April 25, 1973, four days before his 88th birthday, at the Bethesda Naval Hospital in Bethesda, Maryland. He is buried in Arlington National Cemetery. His widow, Martha Richards Fletcher (born 29 March 1895, at Kansas City, Missouri), whom Fletcher married in February, 1917, died seventeen months later, on 14 September 1974. She was buried next to her husband.

== Awards ==

Medal of Honor
Navy Cross	Navy Distinguished Service Medal	Army Distinguished Service Medal
Purple Heart	Mexican Service Medal	World War I Victory Medal with "DESTROYER" clasp
Yangtze Service Medal	American Defense Service Medal	Asiatic-Pacific Campaign Medal with five battle stars
American Campaign Medal	World War II Victory Medal	Navy Occupation Service Medal with "ASIA" clasp

- Companion, Order of the Bath (Dominion of Canada) (1945)
- Mindanao and Sulu Campaign Medal (Philippine Territory) (1924)
- Order of the Dragon of Annam (French Indochina) (1932)

=== Medal of Honor citation ===
For distinguished conduct in battle, engagements of Vera Cruz, 21 and 22 April 1914. Under fire, Lt. Fletcher was eminent and conspicuous in performance of his duties. He was in charge of the Esperanze and succeeded in getting on board over 350 refugees, many of them after the conflict had commenced. Although the ship was under fire, being struck more than 30 times, he succeeded in getting all the refugees placed in safety. Lt. Fletcher was later placed in charge of the train conveying refugees under a flag of truce. This was hazardous duty, as it was believed that the track was mined, and a small error in dealing with the Mexican guard of soldiers might readily have caused a conflict, such a conflict at one time being narrowly averted. It was greatly due to his efforts in establishing friendly relations with the Mexican soldiers that so many refugees succeeded in reaching Vera Cruz from the interior.

=== Navy Cross citation ===
For distinguished service [in WWI] as Commanding Officer of the USS Benham engaged in the important, exacting and hazardous duty of patrolling the waters infested with enemy submarines and mines, in escorting and protecting vitally important convoys of troops and supplies through these waters, and in offensive and defensive action, vigorously and unremittingly prosecuted against all forms of enemy naval activity.

== Legacy ==
Fletcher (DD-992), a Spruance-class destroyer, the second ship to bear the name, was named for Frank Jack Fletcher. The first, Fletcher (DD-445), the lead ship of the Fletcher-class destroyer, commissioned June 30, 1942, was named for his uncle, Frank Friday Fletcher.

The 1976 movie Midway depicted Fletcher (played by Robert Webber) as somewhat confused and hesitant during the battle. Charlton Heston, who played a fictional naval officer working with Fletcher, wrote in his personal journals that this portrayal was based on the advice of some Navy veterans critical of Fletcher, and he said he and Webber tried to make it as subtle as possible.

== See also ==
- List of Medal of Honor recipients
- List of Medal of Honor recipients (Veracruz)
