= USS Artemis (SP-593) =

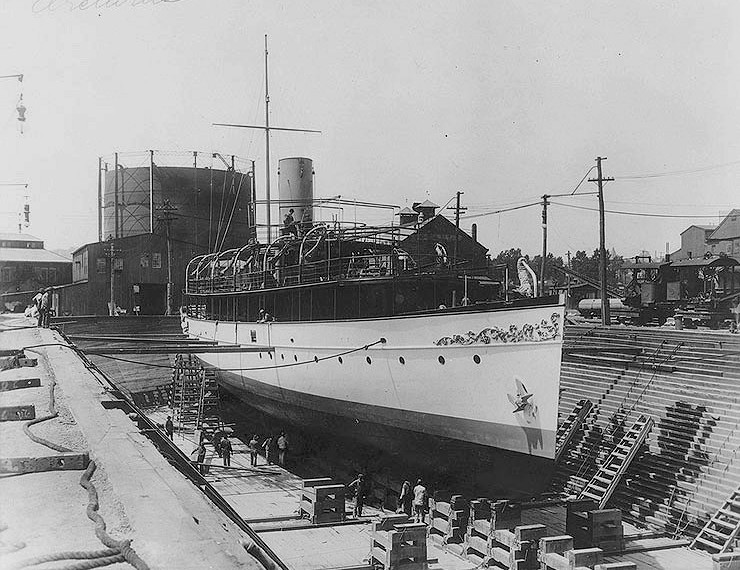
- Steam yacht Cristina in Pusey and Jones Company drydock 11 May 1912. (Note: Original photo is in Hagley Digital Archives, Pusey & Jones collection.).

History

United States
- Name: Cristina (1912–1916); Artemis (1916–1918); Arcturus (1918–1920); Artemis (1920–1927)
- Namesake: An Olympian goddess known to the Romans as Diana. Artemis was the twin of Apollo and the patroness of wildlife.
- Owner: Frederick C. Fisher (1912—1916); John Long Severance (1916-1917); U.S. Navy (1917—1920); Foreign ownership, several (1920—1927)
- Builder: Pusey and Jones Company, Wilmington, Delaware
- Yard number: 349
- Launched: 1911
- Completed: 1912
- Acquired: by the Navy on 4 July 1917
- Commissioned: 17 October 1917 as USS Artemis (SP 593)
- Decommissioned: 5 May 1919
- Stricken: circa 1919
- Identification: U.S. Official Number 209890; Signal LCJW (Cristina/Artemis)
- Fate: Burned and sank 25 February 1927

General characteristics
- Type: Yacht
- Tonnage: 456 GRT, 272 Net
- Length: 177 ft 6 in (54.10 m) (overall); 161 ft 3 in (49.1 m) (registry); 155 ft 10 in (47.5 m) LBP
- Beam: 26 ft 3 in (8.00 m)
- Draft: 10 ft (3.0 m)
- Depth: 15 ft (4.6 m)
- Propulsion: Twin screw, 2 x Almay boilers, 2 x triple expansion engines
- Speed: 12 kn (14 mph; 22 km/h)
- Complement: 65 officers and enlisted; 69 men, no officer breakdown
- Armament: 2 × 3-inch/50-caliber gun, 2 × .30 in (7.6 mm) machine guns, 2 × racks for depth charges and nine American Mark II, Mod 1 depth charges

USS Artemis (SP-593), launched as the steam yacht Cristina then upon sale the yacht was renamed Artemis. The yacht was purchased by the United States Navy during World War I and the name was retained. Artemis was armed with guns and depth charges and sent to Europe as a patrol craft to protect Allied ships from German submarines and other dangers. The patrol yacht was renamed Arcturus in 1918. Post-war, she was returned to the United States and turned over to the United States Coast and Geodetic Survey. Later, again Artemis, the vessel was in civilian operation until burning and sinking in 1927.

== Yachts ==
=== Cristina ===
Cristina was a steel-hulled steam yacht designed by naval architects Gielow and Orr and built at Wilmington, Delaware by Pusey and Jones Co. for Frederick C. Fletcher of Boston, Massachusetts. (Note: The steam yacht Cristina was preceded by a motor yacht named Cristina. That motor yacht became USS Suzanne (SP-510) 18 May 1917.) The yacht was launched in 1911 and completed in 1912. Cristina, with Fletcher aboard, left Wilmington for Philadelphia and Boston on 16 May 1912.

The yacht was registered with registry length of 161 ft 3 in (49.1 m) and a depth of 15 ft (4.6 m) under U.S. Official Number 209890 and signal LCJW.

=== Artemis ===
In 1916 the Cleveland philanthropist John Long Severance, who had chartered Christina early in 1916, purchased the yacht and renamed her Artemis. In the brief time before the war and Navy purchase Artemis was listed at the New York Yacht Club with the same signal of LCJW. (Note: See previous reference's illustrations of private signals for the yacht's flag.)

== Navy World War I service ==
=== Conversion to a warship ===
After the U.S. entered World War I in the spring of 1917, the Navy, in its wide-ranging search for ships suitable to serve as patrol craft, purchased Artemis early that summer for $181,300. Delivered on 4 July 1917, the yacht was earmarked for "distant service" 10 days later and assigned the identification number "SP-593".

The Navy's Construction and Repair Bureau information for the vessel in 1918 shows the vessel as being 456 GRT, 272 net tons, 177 ft 6 in (54.1 m) length overall, 155 ft 10 in (47.5 m) length between perpendiculars, 26 ft 3 in (8.0 m) beam, with a mean draft of 10 ft (3.0 m) with one funnel and two masts. Speed is 12 kn (14 mph; 22 km/h), 10 kn (12 mph; 19 km/h) cruising with a bunker capacity of 90 tons for a cruising range of 1,800 nmi (2,100 mi; 3,300 km). Propulsion is shown as 2 Almay boilers providing steam to 2 triple expansion steam engines driving two propellers with 1,400 indicated horsepower. A 15-kilowatt 110-volt generator and a 7.5-kilowatt 125-volt generator supplied electrical power. There was a 0.5 kilowatt wireless installed.

On 9 October 1917, Captain Newton A. McCully assumed command of Squadron 5, Patrol Force, and, over the ensuing days, inspected the vessels tentatively assigned to his command. After visiting Artemis at Shewan's Shipyard, Brooklyn, New York, he reported her to be a "good, well-built, apparently seaworthy boat ..." and recommended that her conversion work be expedited. Accordingly, on 17 October 1917, Artemis (SP-593) was placed in commission.

Over the next week, Artemis remained at the Shewan yard, undergoing the modifications necessary to convert her from a peacetime cruising yacht to a diminutive man-of-war – such alterations as the installation of gun mounts and magazines, the fitting-out quarters for officers and men, and the overhauling of her boilers and machinery. During that time, Capt. McCully twice visited the ship (on 18 and 24 October) to check the work's progress. On 1 November, Artemis shifted to the New York Navy Yard where she received her main battery of two 3-inch (76 mm) guns. Two days later, she stood out of New York Harbor with the French subchaser SC-S5 in tow, bound for Bermuda.

=== Proceeding to Europe ===
Artemis' initial mission was a part in the operation of towing ten 110 ft (34 m) subchasers – built in American boatyards for the French government – from New York City to Leixoes, Portugal. Each chaser was assigned to a converted yacht which would tow and maintain her. Artemis towed her 70 long tons (71 t) charge – SC-65 – to Bermuda where she arrived on 9 November to coal ship and provision.

Artemis stood out of Grassy Bay on 18 November and, three hours out, picked up a towline from Hannibal that would pull her for over three days. The plans had called for the chasers to depart after the converted yachts had left, overhauling the latter at their best economical speed. After effecting a rendezvous, the yachts were to tow the chasers as far as the Azores. Unfortunately, bad weather interfered.

=== Encountering bad weather ===
May and Wenonah left the column on 21 November to search for Druid and the French subchasers; and, the following day, Artemis cast off from Hannibal and took under tow her former charge, SC-65. A week later, after standing by as SC-65 provisioned at sea from Hannibal, she cast off the one chaser and picked up another, SC-66.

Hannibal undertook to tow a veritable train of ships and craft on 1 December, as she took Artemis in tow for the second time, the yacht towing, in turn, SC-315 and SC-65. Upon arrival off the port of Fayal, Horta, in the Azores, on 7 December, Artemis proceeded under her own power, releasing SC-315 but retaining SC-65 – the latter disabled by a defective fuel pump – and took her into Fayal.

Artemis got underway once more on the morning of the 9th with SC-65 tethered astern. Hannibal, Lyndonia, and Rambler also accompanied her – with the latter two each towing a subchaser, SC-315 and SC-347, respectively. These vessels, like SC-65, had been disabled by defective fuel pumps.

=== Arrival in the Azores ===
After reaching Ponta Delgada, Azores, the next day, Artemis served as guardship for the harbor on 14 December and conducted target practice beyond the 3 mi (4.8 km) limit on the 17th-18th before leaving the Azores on the final leg of the voyage to Leixoes, with SC-65 astern once more.

During the passage, the ship ran into foul weather on the 21st. Artemis rolled deeply in the heavy seas; and the towline parted, leaving SC-65 to her own devices. Fortunately, repairs enabled her to resume the voyage under her own power. Two days later, Capt. McCully, the squadron commander, embarked in May and directed Artemis – battered by the storm – to put into Gibraltar for repairs, and she arrived there on 26 December 1917.

=== Rescuing survivors of a U-boat attack ===
Over the next month, Artemis underwent voyage repairs before she again stood out to sea on 28 January 1918 to serve as part of the escort for a convoy then forming up for Bizerte, Tunisia. The next day at 14:50, while Artemis was steaming on the left wing of the formation, an enemy submarine torpedoed the convoy guide, SS Maizar, striking the merchantman's port side, forward of her bridge. Artemis and the other escorts immediately went to general quarters. As the hunt proceeded fruitlessly, Maizar settled forward, and her crew abandoned her. Artemis took on board 16 of the ship's survivors, and at 15:50, the convoy's screen gave up the hunt and secured from general quarters.

The convoy arrived at Bizerte on 3 February without further mishap. The following day, after coaling at Sidi Abdullah, Artemis stood out of Bizerte harbor with the Gibraltar-bound convoy, GB-12. No enemy submarines molested the Allied ships during the passage, and they all reached "Gib" safely during the predawn darkness of 9 February.

=== Another U-boat alarm ===
However, for Artemis, there was no resting from her labors. Underway again for Bizerte on 14 February, the yacht saw an explosion on board SS Vidar and called all hands to stations. Still, even as she surged forward, she determined the explosion to be internal – not caused by a submarine torpedo – and stood down from battle stations. The next afternoon, another merchantman, SS Tenterton, sounded the submarine alarm, and Artemis spent almost an hour at general quarters, searching for the supposed submersible before securing it at 15:10, empty-handed. Two hours later, Cythera fired one shell, which sent Artemis to battle stations again and put her on a zig-zag course off the port quarter of the formation. When her lookouts sighted no sign of an enemy, the ship stood down again.

Artemis continued to escort convoys between Gibraltar and North Africa into mid-March: convoys BG-12 (20–24 February), GB-16 (2–6 March), and BG-17 (12–17 March) before Lt. Comdr. Hazard – relieved by 1st Lt. C. F. Howell, USCG, on 29 March – left the ship for duty in Birmingham. Artemis soon went to sea under her new commanding officer with a convoy to Bizerte (3–7 April) and commenced the return voyage with a Gibraltar-bound convoy on 8 April. However, fresh westerly breezes soon began breaking up the "good formation" enjoyed since the voyage had begun. Artemis, playing a shepherd to her straying flock, managed to prod SS North Pacific and SS Jason back in line before the yacht's engineers noted a recurrence of her chronic condenser trouble.

=== Ship repairs in Algiers ===
At 20:20 on 10 April, Artemis received permission from the escort commander to leave the convoy and headed toward Algiers for repairs. At 09:52 on the 11th, her engines ceased throbbing, the steam exhausted. The tug Alger arrived on the scene shortly before noon and, together with a French tug, towed the ailing yacht into Algiers harbor. After a brief drydocking (13–17 April), the converted yacht got underway on 23 April to return to Gibraltar and arrived there on the 25th.

=== Continued convoy operations ===
Five days later, she sailed to carry out a special escort mission. On 1 May, as Artemis was proceeding toward rendezvous with an American merchantman off Cartagena, Spain, she spotted two suspicious-looking submarines—escorted by a torpedo boat—operating on the surface within Spanish territorial waters. The former yacht went to general quarters. She arrived at her designated rendezvous point off Escombrera Island at 15:20 and then stood in towards the coast, carefully plotting her course so that it did not take her within the 3 mi (4.8 km) limit. Soon thereafter, the torpedo boat commenced making "an immense smoke screen" that effectively concealed the entrance into Cartagena of the strange submersibles.

About three hours later, SS Don Neal – Artemis' assigned charge – stood out of Cartagena Harbor. The yacht took her into convoy at 18:50 and set a course for Oran, French Morocco. As Don Neal plodded along at 7 kn (8.1 mph; 13 km/h), her escort zig-zagged watchfully on each side of the base course and made a complete circle of her consort every half-hour. Twice, the latter appeared to have been somewhat casual about "darkening ship." Fortunately, enemy submarines were not afoot, and the little convoy reached Oran safely on 2 May.

=== Dropping depth charges on a U-boat ===
As before, though, the respite afforded the yacht was slight. She weighed anchor again on 3 May, bound for Gibraltar. Daybreak the following day found the ship steaming on the right wing of the formation, gun watches and lookouts posted as usual. At 07:25, Artemis sighted "what was undoubtedly the wake of a submerged submarine" and went to general quarters. Two minutes later, the convoy guide sounded the alarm by whistle and flag hoist. Then, six minutes after the initial sighting, Artemis dropped a depth charge to port over bubbles and the slick water that marked the submarine's path beneath the waves. After the resultant explosion, Artemis cautiously claimed possible destruction of the undersea craft, but postwar accounting revealed the loss of no submarine on that day.

She subsequently sighted the wreckage of a large schooner (possibly an earlier submarine victim) "evidently damaged by gunfire" lying on her beam ends. Several ships of the convoy, apparently thinking that the low shape of the wreck might be a surfaced submarine, fired at it.

Soon after the hunt, Artemis rejoined the convoy and shepherded it into Gibraltar's harbor on 5 May. The next day, the ship received on board and fitted two racks for her depth charges and nine American Mark II, mod. 1 charges to go with them.

=== Hurried departure from Oran ===
Artemis then operated between Gibraltar, Algiers, and Oran through mid-May, visiting Oran for the second time during that period, embarking five survivors of the torpedoed British merchantman SS Mavisbrook for passage to Gibraltar. The return passage was urgent; at 18:00 on 26 May, Artemis received orders to round up her liberty party and get underway in two hours. For those next two hours, five petty officers from the ship scoured the Oran waterfront looking for Artemis' sailors and returned at 20:15 with all but three. Weighing anchor at 20:27, almost a half-hour behind schedule, the yacht proceeded out to sea but soon encountered her old gremlin—boiler trouble. She arrived at Oran on the morning of the 27th, where the three missing men rejoined the ship.

Repaired, Artemis put to sea again on 28 May, but the chronic condenser casualties aborted her mission of escorting merchantman SS Ixion to Gibraltar; the yacht returned to anchorage the next day. Underway again on the last day of May with a convoy of six merchantmen and five tugs, Artemis finally reached Gibraltar on 2 June.

=== Change of name to Arcturus ===
Artemis' log carries the notation on 2 June: "Received notice from Commander, U. S. Patrol Squadrons based on Gibraltar [of] change of name of vessel from Artemis to Arcturus in accordance with General Order No. 371 . . ." That order had been signed on 20 February 1918. The ship had operated for over three months before the official change caught up with her.

Although her name was now different, her duties remained the same. Still based in Gibraltar, Arcturus, over the next two months, thrice escorted the cable ship Amber to Lagos Bay, Portugal, the latter laboring on undersea lines of communication along the Portuguese coast. Interspersed with this duty was a stint escorting the French transport Souirah (6–9 July) and missions transporting high-ranking passengers, such as Rear Admiral Albert P. Niblack, General Sir Herbert Guthrie-Smith, and the Episcopal Dean of Gibraltar to Tangier, Morocco, and back (10 July) as well as taking on board 32 survivors of the Italian merchantman SS Silvia from the Spanish bark Suarez II (10 July) for passage back to Gibraltar.

=== Return to Gibraltar operations ===
Arcturus spent August 1918 at Lisbon, Portugal, for repairs before she resumed operations on Gibraltar after escorting the French submarine Astree to "The Rock" on 6–7 September. As a further variation on her regular theme of escort duty, Arcturus twice voyaged to Tangier and back, transporting Moors from Gibraltar to Morocco (10–11 September). She rounded out September by escorting the British merchantman SS Wethersfield to Hornillo, Spain (23–24 September), and another period of operations with the cable ship Amber.

She operated with Amber again from 1–5 October before joining Druid escorting a convoy of seven (ultimately, eight) merchantmen along the Spanish coastal route to Port Vendres, France, from 8–13 October. Returning to Gibraltar on the 16th, Arcturus weighed anchor 11 days later and headed for Lagos Bay, Portugal, in company with Amber and the tug Crucis. Following the three ships' arrival at that port, Arcturus operated there and at Sines Bay, Portugal, before steaming to Lisbon for coal and provisions.

=== Arcturus sends out SOS ===
She returned to Lagos Bay on 5 November and rejoined Amber and Crucis. The next day, Arcturus encountered heavy sears and rough weather. The ship became increasingly unmanageable shortly after noon due to heavy seas, and steering was shifted to the engines. At 15:20, Ens. J. J. Powers, USNRF, the engineer officer, reported to the captain, Lt. F. William Maennle, USNRF, that there was a leak in the engine room that the pumps could not control.

With the water in the engineering spaces rising rapidly, Maennle ordered the engines stopped and the sea anchor launched. However, these efforts proved unequal to making Arcturus ride the seas head-to. Instead, the yacht's comparatively large top-hamper acted as a veritable sail which the wind used to swing the ship around broadside. At 15:25, Arcturus began broadcasting S.O.S. signals – answered swiftly by her old consort Amber and the tugs Oporto and Monsanta.

In the meantime, with the engineers laboring in the sloshing, rising waters below, Arcturus put over "oil bags" on the weather side to minimize the effect of the heavy seas. Despite this, however, the yacht rolled "dangerously" in the trough of the sea. Given the critical situation, Lt. Maennle mustered all hands – except those detailed to the sea anchor, radio, oil bags, and locating the leak in the engine room – at their abandon ship stations, with their life preservers on. Prepared for the worst, Arcturus' men hung on.

Then, shortly after, Amber came close aboard at 15:55 to be told to stand by to leeward. Ens. Powers reported at 16:00 that he and his persevering (and wet) engineers had located the leak – the main injection pump had carried away – and efforts were being made to stop it and pump out the water, which had risen to a height of 5 ft (1.5 m) in the engine and fire rooms. The situation looked much better for all concerned, so Arcturus annulled her S. 0. S. signals at 16:08, with Amber and Crucis sticking faithfully near. At 16:25, temporary repairs were completed, Arcturus was ready to get underway and proceed to Lisbon. Accompanied initially by her two consorts (which she lost sight of at 00:45 on the 7th), the converted yacht reached her destination at 09:35 on 7 November.

=== End-of-war operations ===
At 13:50 on 11 November, while still at Lisbon undergoing repairs, Arcturus received word of the armistice, ending hostilities, and the admonition to naval vessels to maintain "all precautions against attack from submarines." Those enemy men-of-war were treated as "friendly unless hostilities are obvious."

== Return to America ==
On 6 December, Arcturus embarked six passengers for transportation back to the U.S., and at 07:00 on the 7th, got underway for home in company with Wheeling, Surveyor, the Coast Guard cutters Yamacraw, Druid and Wenonah. One day out of Ponta Delgada, Arcturus suffered the now-familiar problem with her condensers, and, while the other ships proceeded on, Surveyor stood by the ailing Arcturus on 11 December.

Subsequently, encountering more condenser troubles occasioned by the pounding the ship was taking in the December gales, Arcturus had to be taken in tow by Surveyor on Christmas Day. Casting off on the 27th, Arcturus arrived at Grassy Bay under her own power the following day. On the last day of 1918, the yacht sailed for New London, Connecticut on the last leg of her homeward-bound voyage.

Reaching New London on 3 January 1919, Arcturus spent over two months (except for a trip to Melville, Rhode Island and back on 4–5 January 1919, for coal) at the District Base, New London, assigned to the Atlantic Fleet's Reserve Squadron. Underway for New York City on 25 March, the yacht moored at pier 72, East River, that evening. She moved to the navy yard two days later for coal and ultimately arrived at Ulmer Park Marine Basin, Brooklyn, New York, on 30 March.

== Post-war decommissioning ==
Shifting briefly to the Staten Island Shipbuilding Co. at Mariners' Harbor, she returned to the Ulmer Park basin at noon on 2 May. Soon thereafter, Arcturus was simultaneously decommissioned on 5 May, struck from the Naval Vessel Register, and turned over to the United States Coast and Geodetic Survey.

== Subsequent maritime career ==
Arcturus' service with that agency proved short since she was returned to the Navy on 15 January 1920 and ordered "inspected for sale." Sold to J. M. Scott of New York City on 4 October, she resumed her prewar name, Artemis, and retained it for the rest of her days.

Sometime during 1924 or 1925, J. W. Hunter, a British subject, acquired Artemis, but passed ownership to another Briton, R. Rose, about a year later. Subsequently acquired by the Tropical Fruit and Steamship Company, a Honduran firm, Artemis burned and sank in the Atlantic Ocean off Key West, Florida, on 25 February 1927.

== See also ==
USS Suzanne (SP-510)
