= Frank Friday Fletcher =

United States Navy admiral

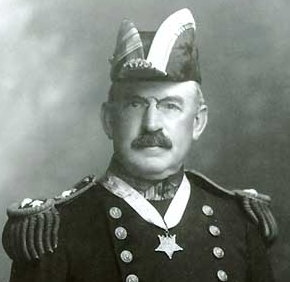
- Fletcher wearing his Medal of Honor, c. 1919
- Born: November 23, 1855; Oskaloosa, Iowa, U.S.
- Died: November 28, 1928 (aged 73); New York City, New York, U.S.
- Burial place: Arlington National Cemetery
- Relatives: Frank Jack Fletcher (nephew); Reverend Caleb Rochford Stetson (brother-in-law)
- Military career
- Allegiance: United States
- Branch: United States Navy
- Service years: 1875–1919
- Rank: Rear Admiral
- Commands: Atlantic Fleet
- Conflicts: Spanish–American War; Battle of Veracruz; World War I
- Awards: Medal of Honor; Navy Distinguished Service Medal

Frank Friday Fletcher (November 23, 1855 – November 28, 1928) was a United States Navy admiral who served in the late 19th and early 20th centuries. He was awarded the U.S. military's highest decoration, the Medal of Honor, for his actions as commander of navy forces at the Battle of Veracruz, Mexico. The Fletcher-class destroyer, the most produced class of United States Navy destroyers, was named after him. He was also the uncle of Frank Jack Fletcher, another U.S. Navy admiral who also received the Medal of Honor for actions at Veracruz, and who commanded American naval forces at the battles of Coral Sea, Midway, in the Eastern Solomons, and the Aleutian Campaign during World War II.

== Biography ==
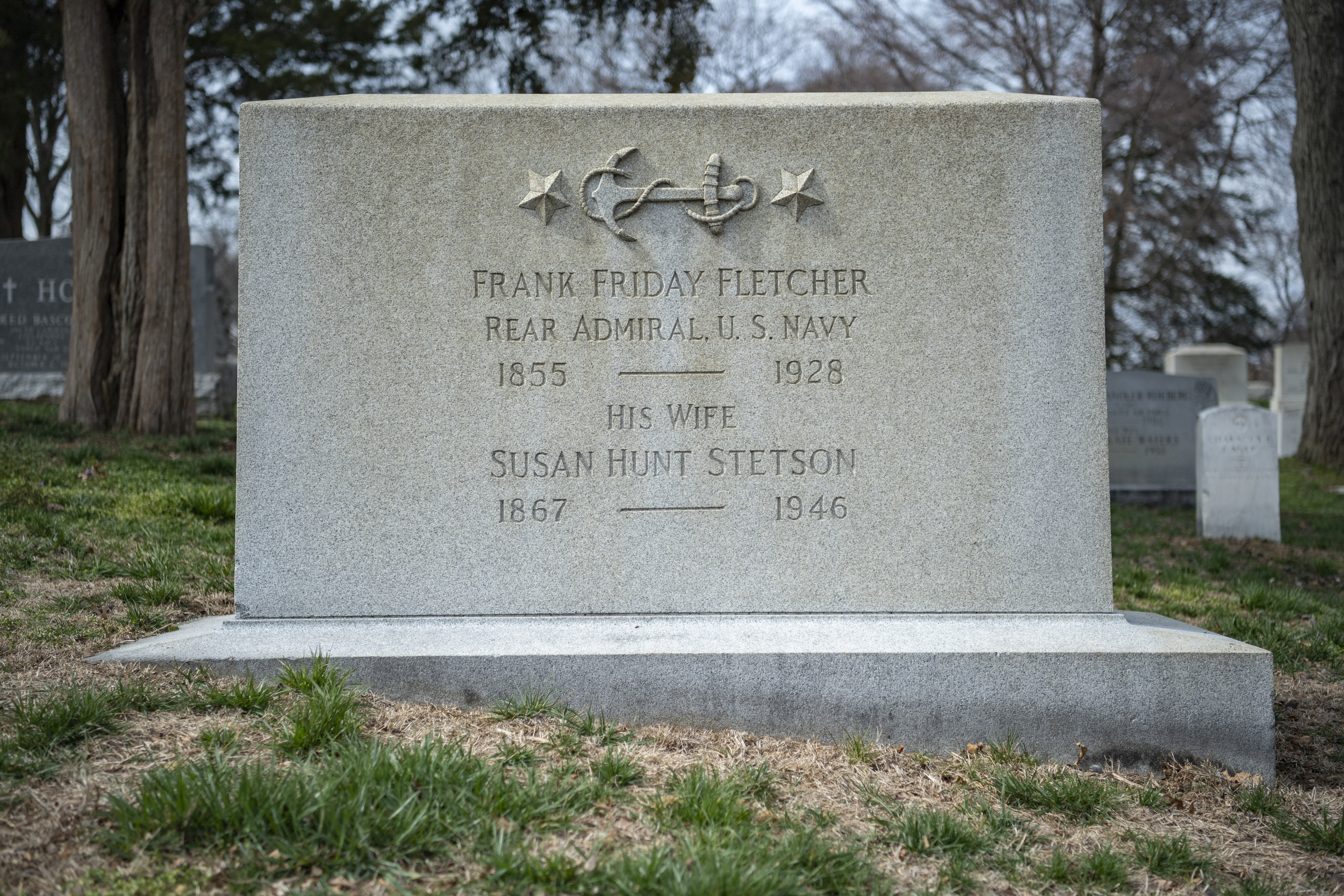
Grave at Arlington National Cemetery

Fletcher was born on November 23, 1855, in Oskaloosa, Iowa. He graduated from the U.S. Naval Academy in 1875 and spent the next year as a midshipman on USS Tuscarora. Promoted to ensign in July 1876, he had sea duty on the sloops of war Portsmouth, Plymouth, Lackawanna and Constellation before participating in USS Ticonderoga's voyage around the world in 1878–1881. Fletcher advanced to the rank of master (later lieutenant, junior grade) in April 1882 and was next assigned to the Hydrographic Office in Washington, D.C. In July 1884, he reported to USS Quinnebaug for service in European waters. After ordnance training in late 1887, he had five years' duty at the Bureau of Ordnance, during which time he was promoted to lieutenant and made notable contributions to gun mechanism design and shipboard navigation.

From 1892 to 1895, Fletcher commanded the navy's first torpedo boat, USS Cushing, based at the Torpedo Station in Newport, Rhode Island, and developed the navy's first torpedo warfare doctrine. He then served in the battleship USS Maine before returning to the Newport Torpedo Station in October 1896. After a brief tour as Assistant Chief of the Bureau of Ordnance in the spring of 1898, Lieutenant Fletcher became commanding officer of the converted yacht USS Kanawha. From October 1898 to July 1901 he commanded the surveying ship USS Eagle and, in March 1899, was promoted to lieutenant commander.

In the fall of 1901, Fletcher returned to ordnance duty and was closely involved with torpedo warfare. A year later he became Chief of Staff of the Asiatic Fleet and later in 1905 assumed command of the cruiser USS Raleigh. Fletcher attended the Naval War College courses in both 1907 and 1908 and in 1908 was assigned to the navy's General Board during the next year. That same year, he became a member of the District of Columbia Society of the Sons of the American Revolution.

He was promoted to captain in May 1908 and from November of that year to March 1910 he commanded the battleship USS Vermont. In the spring of 1910, Fletcher became the Secretary of the Navy's Aide for Material. While in that post, he reached the rank of rear admiral. From 1912 to 1914, he commanded battleship divisions of the Atlantic Fleet. In April 1914, Fletcher led U.S. Navy forces during the landings at Vera Cruz, Mexico, receiving the Medal of Honor for his "distinguished conduct in battle".

In September 1914, Fletcher began two years as the Atlantic Fleet's Commander in Chief, and was elevated to the rank of admiral in March 1915, the senior of the first three officers to hold the new four-star positions. He was a member of the General Board, the Joint Army and Navy Board and the War Industries Board in 1916–1919, and was awarded the Navy Distinguished Service Medal for "meritorious service" during World War I. He was also awarded the Army Distinguished Service Medal for his work as the navy representative on the War Industries Board.

Admiral Fletcher retired on November 23, 1919, with the rank of rear admiral (as was customary at that time), and later served as an official advisor on contemporary defense issues. Fletcher died on November 28, 1928, in New York City. He was buried at Arlington National Cemetery.

== Personal life ==
Fletcher was married to Susan Hunt Stetson, sister of Reverend Caleb Rochford Stetson. They lived at 404 East 59th Street in Manhattan.

He was the uncle of World War II Admiral Frank Jack Fletcher.

== Legacy ==
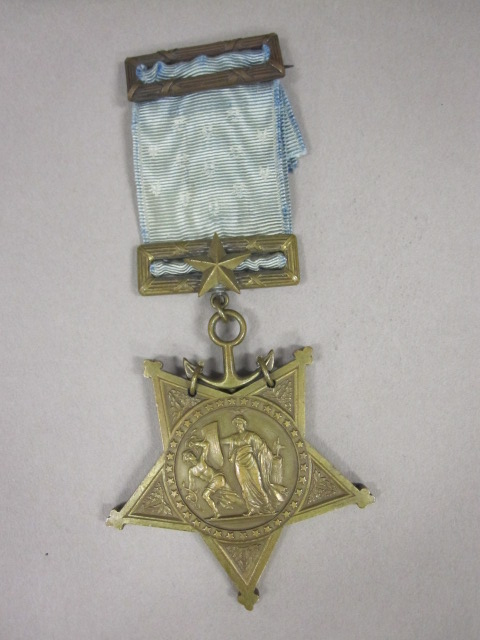
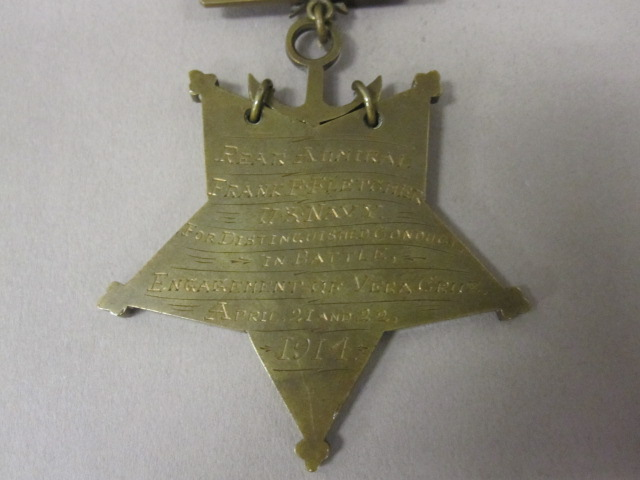
Fletcher's Medal of Honor, front and back

The Fletcher-class destroyer was named for Fletcher and was the most numerous class of destroyers produced during World War II, with 175 completed, and one of the most successful designs of the war. The lead ship in the class, USS Fletcher (DD-445), was in commission from 1942 to 1969.

== Medal of Honor citation ==
Rank and organization: Rear Admiral, U.S. Navy. Born: November 23, 1855, Oskaloosa, Iowa. Accredited to: Iowa. G.O. No.: 177, December 4, 1915.

Citation:

For distinguished conduct in battle, engagements of Vera Cruz, 21 and 22 April 1914. Under fire, Rear Adm. Fletcher was eminent and conspicuous in the performance of his duties; was senior officer present at Vera Cruz, and the landing and the operations of the landing force were conducted under his orders and directions. In connection with these operations, he was at times on shore and under fire.

== Awards ==
- Medal of Honor
- Distinguished Service Medal (U.S. Navy)
- Distinguished Service Medal (U.S. Army)
- Spanish Campaign Medal
- Mexican Service Medal
- World War I Victory Medal

== Dates of rank ==
- Midshipman: June 18, 1870
- Passed Midshipman: June 21, 1875

Ensign	Master	Lieutenant Junior Grade	Lieutenant	Lieutenant Commander	Commander
O-1	O-2	O-2	O-3	O-4	O-5
July 18, 1876	April 1, 1882	March 3, 1883	February 18, 1889	March 3, 1899	March 12, 1904

Captain	Commodore	Rear Admiral	Vice Admiral	Admiral
O-6	O-7	O-8	O-9	O-10
May 1908	Never Held	October 1911	Never Held	March 10, 1915

== See also ==
- List of Medal of Honor recipients (Veracruz)

Military offices
Preceded by Charles J. Badger	Commander-in-Chief of the U.S. Atlantic Fleet; 1914–1916	Succeeded by Henry T. Mayo
