= USS Helenita (SP-210) =

Yacht

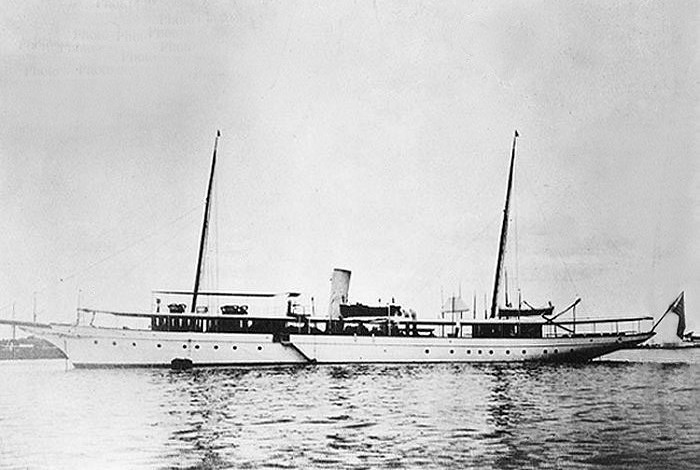
- Helenita (U.S. Steam Yacht, 1902) photographed prior to World War I.

History

United States
- Name: USS Helenita
- Namesake: A former name retained
- Owner: Frank Jay Gould
- Builder: Gas Engine & Power Co., Morris Heights, New York
- Laid down: date unknown
- Acquired: leased by the Navy, August 1917
- Commissioned: 17 October 1917 as USS Helenita (SP-210) at Morris Heights, New York
- Decommissioned: 17 June 1919
- Stricken: circa 1919
- Fate: Returned to owner, 17 June 1919

General characteristics
- Type: Yacht
- Displacement: 304 tons
- Length: 187 ft (57 m)
- Beam: 21 ft (6.4 m)
- Draft: 8 ft 6 in (2.59 m)
- Propulsion: steam engine
- Speed: 16 knots
- Complement: not known
- Armament: Two 3-inch guns

USS Helenita (SP-210) was a yacht leased from its owner by the U.S. Navy during World War I. She was outfitted as an armed patrol craft and initially assigned to North Atlantic Ocean duty, but found to be too lightly built for the ocean. She was then relegated to patrol of Long Island Sound and the Delaware Bay until war's end, when her guns were removed and she was returned to her owner.

== Yacht built in New York ==
The first ship to be so named by the U.S. Navy, Helenita was a 304-ton steam yacht built in 1902 by Gas Engine & Power Co., Morris Heights, New York, acquired by the Navy from Frank J. Gould August 1917, and commissioned 17 October 1917 at Morris Heights, New York.

== World War I service ==
Originally intended for foreign service, Helenita sailed from Newport, Rhode Island, to Bermuda 4 November, and until 1 January 1918 engaged in patrol, search, and dispatch service out of Bermuda. Found to be too lightly built for sea service, she was sent back to the United States, arriving 10 January 1918 at Charleston, South Carolina. Helenita then entered Philadelphia Navy Yard 17 January for extensive repairs.

Subsequently, Helenita was assigned briefly in May to New London, Connecticut, and New York City, moving to Base 2, Delaware Bay, as a patrol vessel in June. She continued on this duty as a district craft in the Long Island Sound and Delaware Bay areas until sent to Norfolk, Virginia, for repairs 6 August to 26 November 1918.

== Post-war decommissioning ==
Returning to New York in May 1919, Helenita decommissioned and was simultaneously returned to her owner 17 June 1919.
