= USS Rambler =

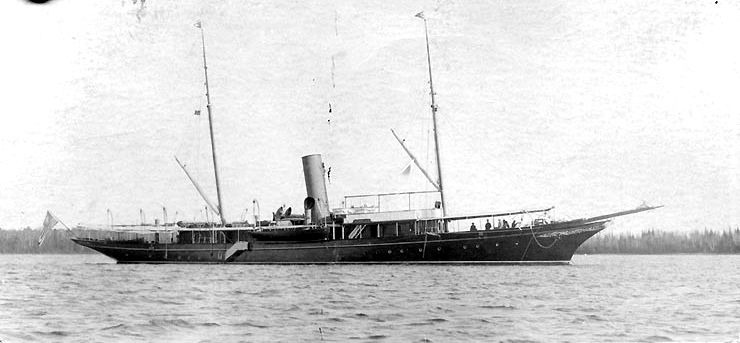
- Steam yacht Rambler in port before her U.S. Navy service during World War I

History

United States
- Name: Rambler
- Port of registry: Chicago
- Builder: Lewis Nixon; Elizabethport, New Jersey
- Launched: 1900
- Acquired: 16 August 1917
- Commissioned: 19 October 1917
- Decommissioned: 9 July 1919
- Stricken: 27 August 1919
- Fate: Sold 16 September 1919

General characteristics
- Tonnage: 288 GRT; 196 NRT
- Length: 177 ft (54 m) overall; 155.3 ft (47.3 m) registered
- Beam: 23 ft (7.0 m)
- Draft: 11–6 ft (3.4–1.8 m)
- Depth: 12.5 ft (3.8 m)
- Installed power: 63 NHP
- Propulsion: 1 × triple-expansion engine; 1 × screw
- Speed: 13 knots (24 km/h)
- Armament: 2 × 3"/50 caliber guns; 2 × machine guns

USS Rambler (SP-211) was a steam yacht acquired by the United States Navy during World War I for patrol duty.

== History ==
Rambler, built in 1900 by Lewis Nixon of Elizabethport, New Jersey, was acquired by the Navy, 16 August 1917 from Kenneth Van Riper of New York City and commissioned at New York on 19 October 1917.

Rambler sailed for the Azores 4 November and operated with the patrol detachment there until February 1918. Then transferred to the French coast, the armed yacht operated out of Brest on patrol and escort duty for the remainder of World War I.

After the Armistice, Rambler remained in European waters and into the second quarter of 1919 carried mail and passengers between British and French ports. On 20 May, she got underway for the United States and arrived at New York late in June. She was decommissioned 9 July 1919; was struck from the Navy list 27 August; and was sold to J. M. Scott, of New York City, on 16 September 1919.

== Bibliography ==
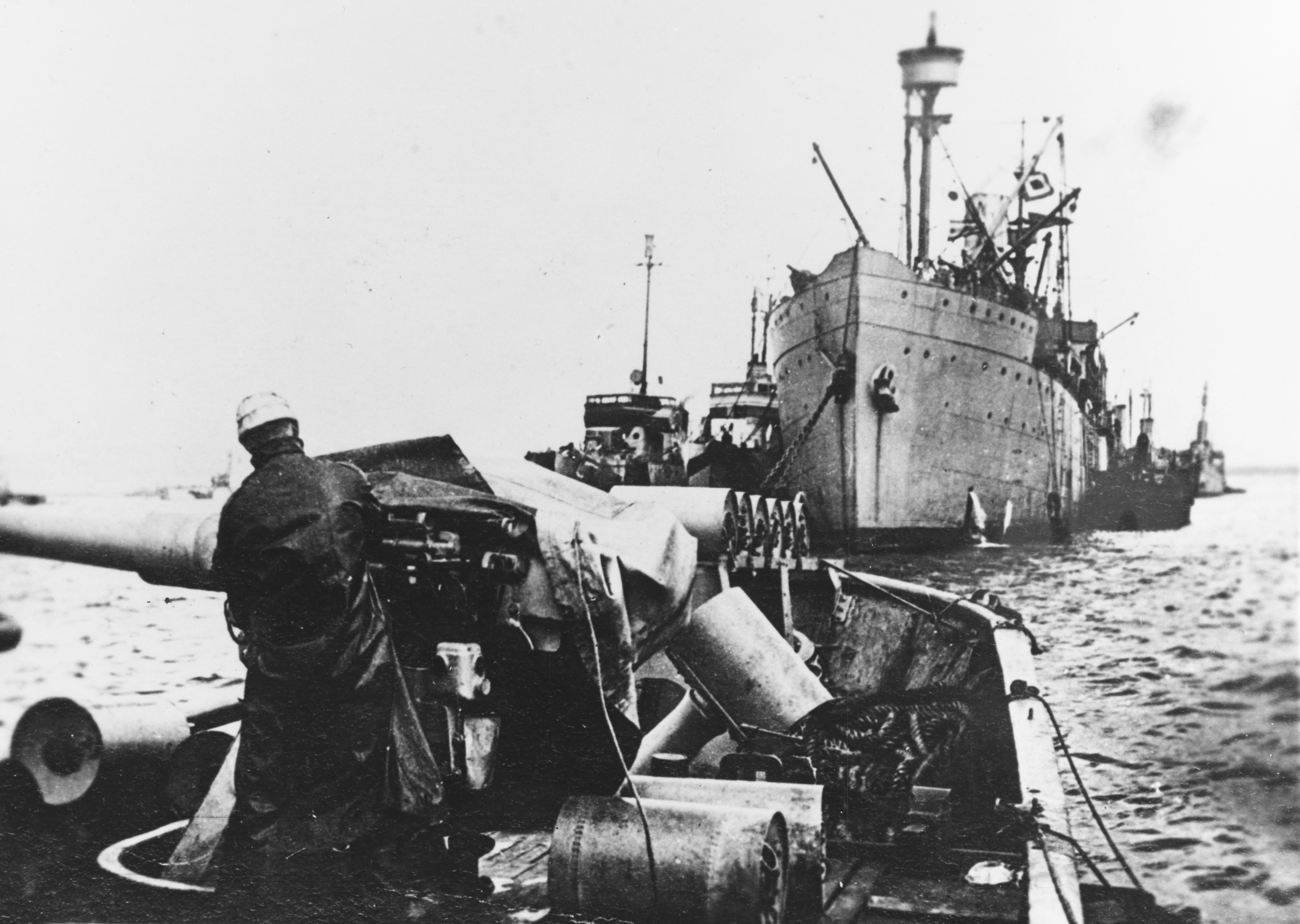
A crewman tends to the 3"/50 caliber gun on the fantail of USS Rambler at Brest, France, in 1918. Destroyer tender Bridgeport, with two destroyers at her side, is behind Rambler.
