= Admiral Johnston =

Admiral Johnston may refer to:

- Charles H. Johnston (born 1948), U.S. Navy rear admiral
- Clarence Howard-Johnston (1903–1996), British Royal Navy admiral
- Clive Johnstone (born 1963), British Royal Navy vice admiral
- David Johnston (admiral) (born 1962), Royal Australian Navy vice admiral
- Means Johnston Jr. (1916–1989), U.S. Navy admiral
- Rufus Zenas Johnston (1874–1959), U.S. Navy rear admiral

== See also ==
- Tony Johnstone-Burt (born 1958), British Royal Navy vice admiral
