= Milmore =

Milmore is a surname. Notable people with the surname include:

- Jane Milmore (1955–2020), American playwright and actress
- Jennifer Milmore (born 1969), American actress
- Martin Milmore (1844–1883), American sculptor

== See also ==
- John Millmore, United States Navy sailor and Medal of Honor recipient
