= Delaware County Society of the New Jerusalem Church =

Church in Pennsylvania, United States

The Delaware County Society of the New Jerusalem Church was established about 1828. Construction of the church building began on June 7, 1830. The church was officially incorporated as the New Jerusalem Society of Edenfield, Delaware County, Pennsylvania on September 2, 1861. The church building was removed in about 1912 and those interred in the church's burial ground were removed to an unmarked grave in Mount Zion Cemetery in Collingdale, Pennsylvania in 1977.

== Notable burials ==
- Francis Bailey (1744–1817)
- Richard DeCharms (1797–1864)
- Henry Lakin Simpson (1861–1881) - Medal of Honor recipient
