= Harry L. Hawthorne =

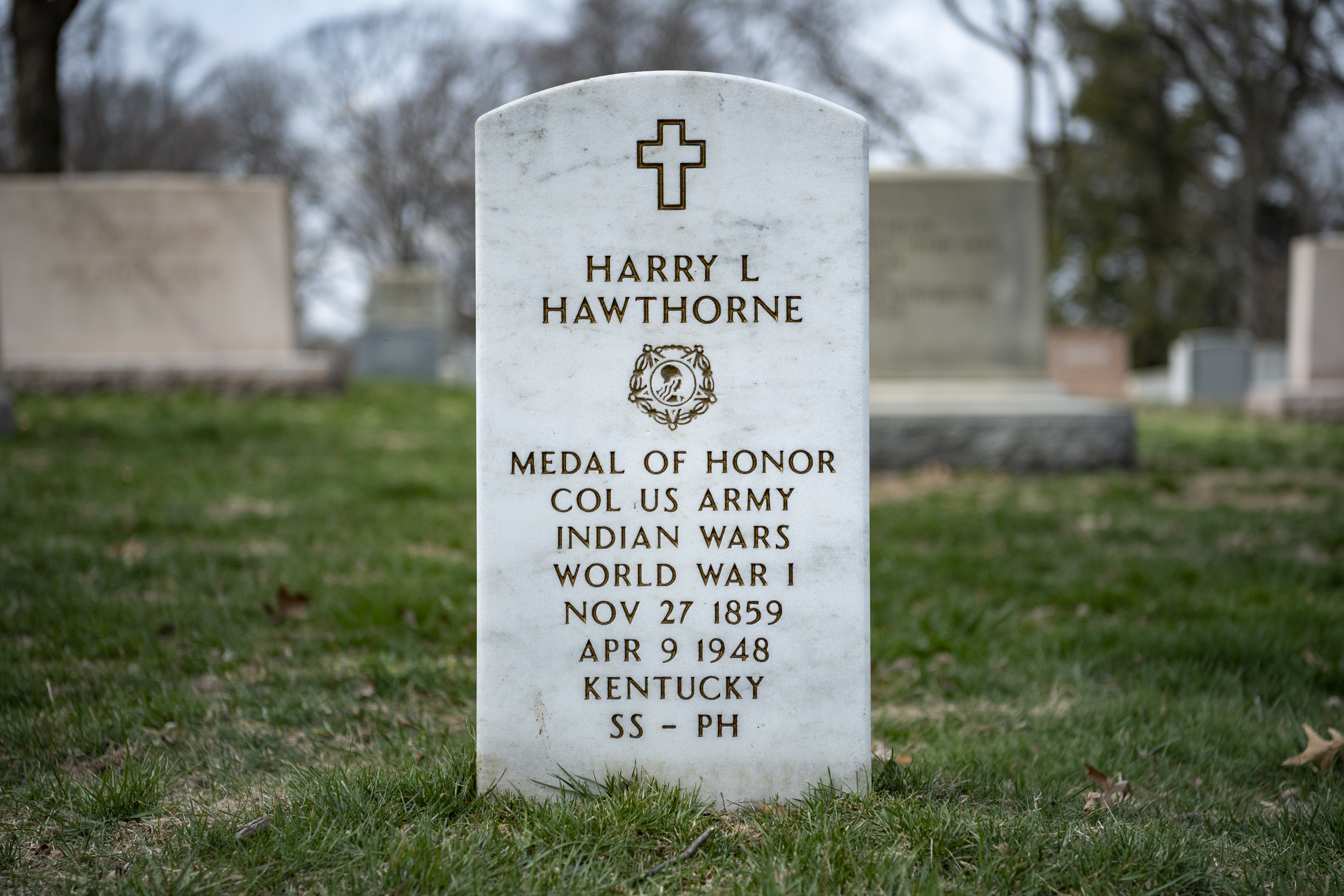
- Grave at Arlington National Cemetery
- Born: November 27, 1859; Minnesota
- Died: April 10, 1948 (aged 88)
- Burial place: Arlington National Cemetery
- Military career
- Allegiance: United States of America
- Branch: United States Navy; United States Army
- Service years: 1882 - 1884 (Navy); 1884 - 1914, 1917 - 1919 (Army)
- Rank: Cadet Engineer (Navy); Colonel (Army)
- Unit: 2nd Artillery Regiment
- Conflicts: Wounded Knee Massacre
- Awards: Medal of Honor

Harry LeRoy Hawthorne (November 27, 1859 – April 10, 1948) was a Medal of Honor recipient for his actions during the Wounded Knee Massacre.

Hawthorne was born in 1859 in Minnesota. He graduated from the United States Naval Academy in 1882, but after two years chose to take his commission in the United States Army. He distinguished himself at was then called the Battle of Wounded Knee, but now commonly called the Wounded Knee Massacre receiving the Medal of Honor. He made the Army a career, attending the Army War College and retiring as a colonel in 1914, and was recalled to serve during World War I.

== Medal of Honor citation ==
Rank and organization. 2nd Lieutenant, 2nd U.S. Artillery. Entered service at: Kentucky. Birth: 1860, Minnesota. Place/Date: At Wounded Knee Creek, S. Dak., 29 December 1890.

Citation:

Distinguished conduct in battle with hostile Indians.

== Controversy ==
Mass Grave for the Dead Lakota After the Engagement at Wounded Knee

There have been several attempts by various parties to rescind the Medals of Honor awarded in connection with the Wounded Knee Massacre. Proponents claim that the engagement was in-fact a massacre and not a battle, due to the high number of killed and wounded Lakota women and children and the very one-sided casualty counts. Estimates of the Lakota losses indicate 150–300 killed, of which up to 200 were women and children. Additionally, as many as 51 were wounded. In contrast, the 7th Cavalry suffered 25 killed and 39 wounded, many being the result of friendly fire.

Calvin Spotted Elk, direct descendant of Chief Spotted Elk killed at Wounded Knee, launched a petition to rescind medals from the soldiers who participated in the battle.

The Army has also been criticized more generally for the seemingly disproportionate number of Medals of Honor awarded in connection with the battle. For comparison, 19 Medals were awarded at Wounded Knee, 21 at the Battle of Cedar Creek, and 20 at the Battle of Antietam. Respectively, Cedar Creek and Antietam involved 52,712 and 113,000 troops, suffering 8,674 and 22,717 casualties. Wounded Knee, however, involved 610 combatants and resulted in as many as 705 casualties (including non-combatants).

== See also ==
- List of Medal of Honor recipients
- List of Medal of Honor recipients for the Indian Wars
- List of United States Naval Academy alumni (Medal of Honor)
