= James Patrick Lannon =

United States Navy Medal of Honor recipient

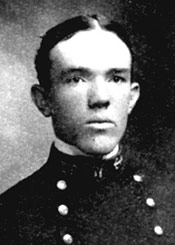
- Lannon as a U.S. Naval Academy midshipman
- Born: October 12, 1878; Alexandria, Virginia, US
- Died: March 13, 1953 (aged 74); Bethesda, Maryland, US
- Burial place: Arlington National Cemetery
- Military career
- Allegiance: United States of America
- Branch: United States Navy
- Service years: 1902–1937; 1942–1947
- Rank: Rear Admiral
- Commands: USS Concord; USS Helena; USS Nashville
- Conflicts: World War I World War II
- Awards: Medal of Honor; Navy Cross; Purple Heart

James Patrick Lannon (October 12, 1878 – March 13, 1953) was United States Navy Medal of Honor recipient. He was born in Alexandria, Virginia. He graduated from the United States Naval Academy in 1902.

He received the Medal of Honor for actions at the United States occupation of Veracruz, 1914. He was awarded the Navy Cross for service as commanding officer of USS Nashville (PG-7) in the Mediterranean Sea during World War I, served in World War II, and retired in 1947.

== Biography ==
In 1916, Lannon attended the Naval War College along with Philip Andrews, Frank D. Berrien, Henry F. Bryan, George F. Cooper, Louis R. de Steiguer, Ben H. Fuller, Templin M. Potts and David F. Sellers. He commanded the gunboat Nashville from October 1917 to October 1918.

After World War I, Lannon commanded the gunboat Helena from May 1923 to September 1924. He was promoted to captain on May 24, 1925. Lannon subsequently commanded the light cruiser Concord from August 1928 to June 1930.

Lannon retired from active duty as a captain on June 30, 1937. During World War II, he was recalled to active duty and promoted to rear admiral on February 23, 1942.

Lannon died on March 13, 1953 at the Bethesda Naval Hospital. He is buried at Arlington National Cemetery.

== Medal of Honor citation ==
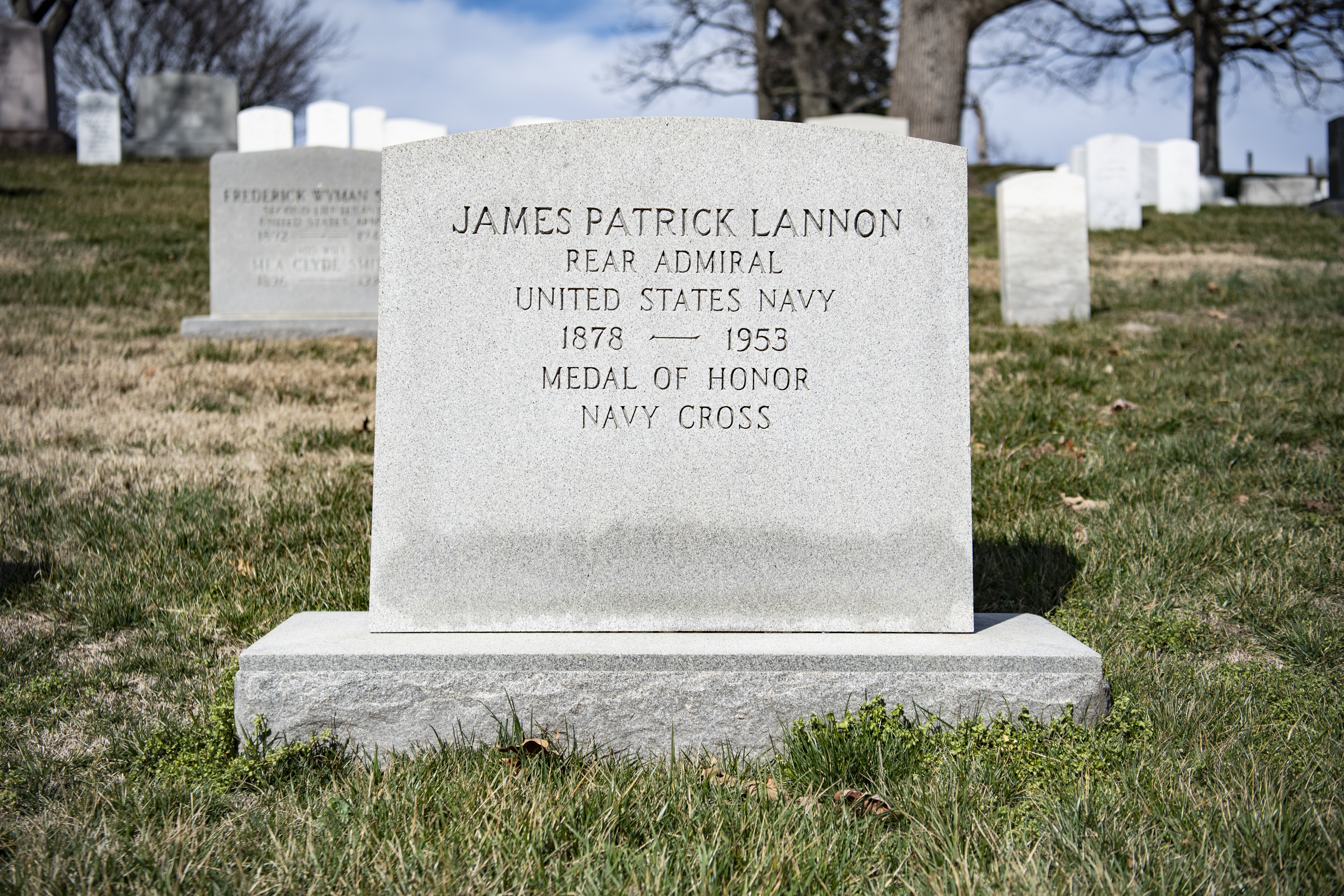
Grave at Arlington National Cemetery

Lieutenant Lannon was awarded the Medal of Honor on December 4, 1915.

Citation:

For extraordinary heroism in battle, engagement of Vera Cruz, 22 April 1914. Lt. Lannon assisted a wounded man under heavy fire, and after returning to his battalion was himself desperately wounded.

He was later also awarded the Purple Heart.

== Navy Cross citation ==
Commander Lannon was awarded the Navy Cross on October 23, 1919.

Citation:

For exceptionally meritorious and distinguished service in the line of his profession as commanding officer of the Nashville, engaged in the important, exacting, and hazardous duty of escorting troops and supplies through waters infested with enemy submarines and mines.

== See also ==
- List of Medal of Honor recipients (Veracruz)
- List of United States Naval Academy alumni (Medal of Honor)
