= USS Essex (1874) =

1876 steamship of the United States Navy

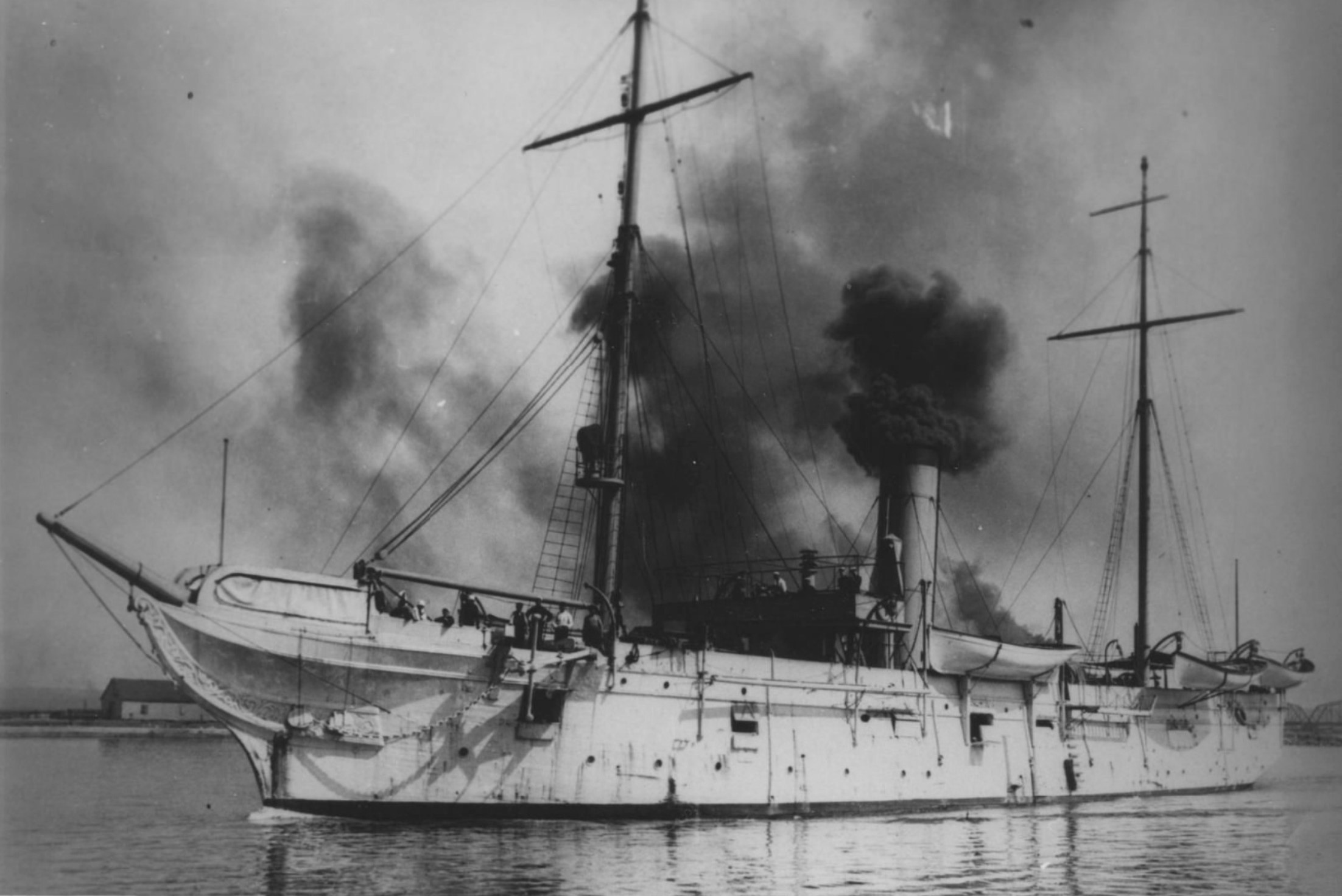
- USS Essex

History

United States
- Name: USS Essex
- Namesake: Essex
- Port of registry: (United States)
- Ordered: 10 February 1873
- Builder: Donald McKay; Kitter Naval Yard
- Laid down: 1874
- Launched: 1874
- Commissioned: 3 October 1876
- Out of service: 23 December 1930
- Stricken: 27 October 1930
- Identification: IX-10
- Fate: Burned to the waterline

General characteristics
- Type: Enterprise-class gunboat
- Displacement: 1,375 long tons (1,397 t)
- Length: 185 ft (56 m)
- Beam: 35 ft (11 m)
- Draft: 14 ft 3 in (4.34 m)
- Propulsion: Fore and aft compound steam engine 1874-1910; Triple expansion steam engine 1910-early 1920s
- Sail plan: Barque-rigged
- Speed: 10 knots (19 km/h; 12 mph)
- Armament: (1876)• 1 × 11 in (280 mm) smoothbore cannon; 4 × 9 in (230 mm) Dalhgrens cannons; 1 × 60-pounder cannon
- Notes: Partial surviving hulk is only known remnant of the work of Donald McKay
- USS Essex Shipwreck Site
- U.S. National Register of Historic Places
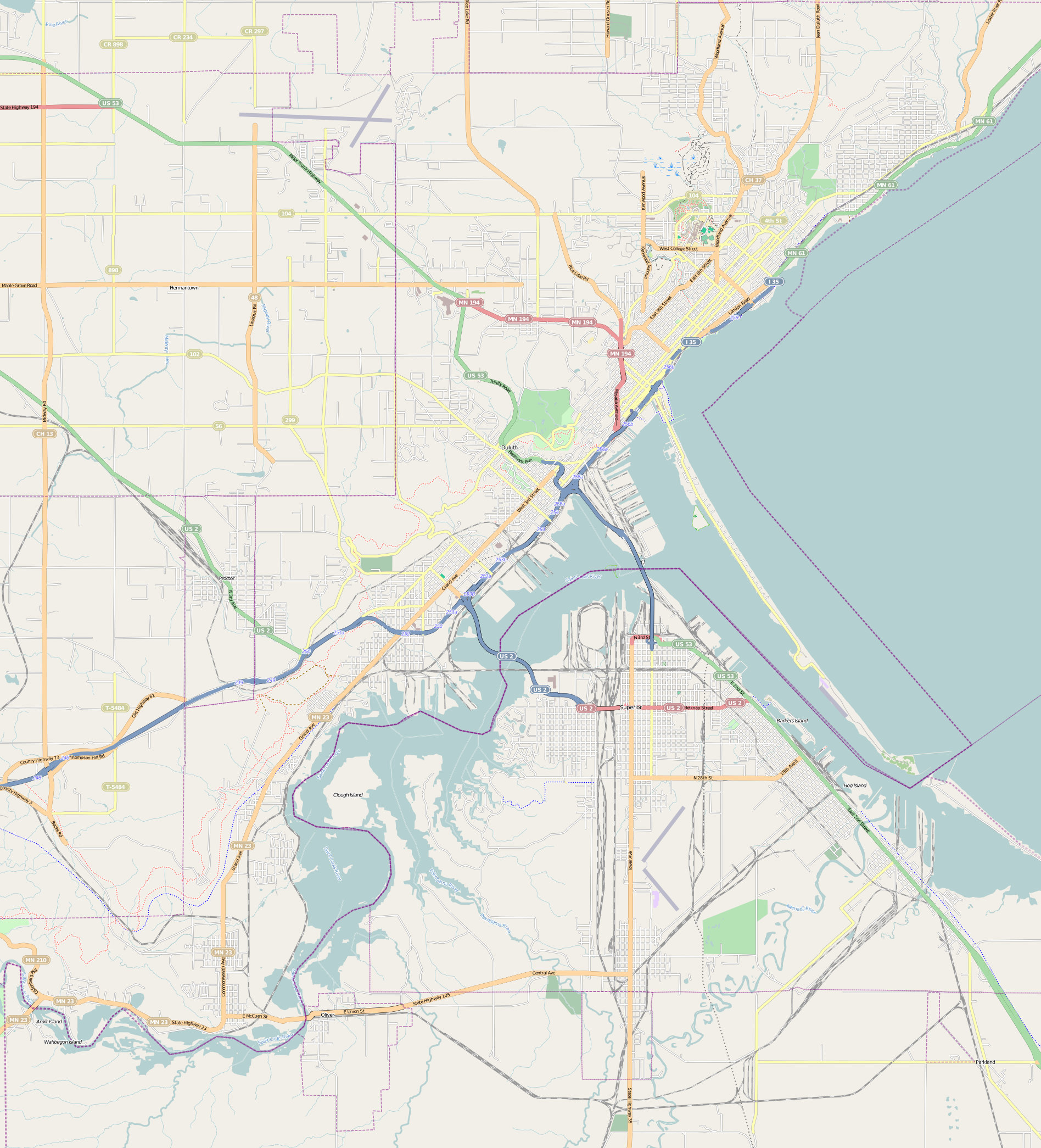
- Location within Duluth Location within Minnesota Location within the United States
- Location: Minnesota Point, Duluth, Minnesota
- Coordinates: 46°42′46″N 92°1′43″W
- MPS: Minnesota's Lake Superior Shipwrecks MPS
- NRHP reference No.: 94000342
- Added to NRHP: 14 April 1994

USS Essex was an Enterprise-class wooden-hulled armed naval steam sloop of war. She was built between 1874 and 1876 by Donald McKay at the Kitter Naval Yard of East Boston, Massachusetts. She was commissioned on 3 October 1876 by the United States Navy. On 23 December 1930 Essex was sold for scrap, and on 14 October 1931 she was taken to the beach just outside Duluth Harbor where they set fire to her; she eventually burned to the waterline. On 14 April 1994 the remains of Essex were listed on the National Register of Historic Places. Her partially surviving hulk is significant because she is the only known remnant of the work of master shipbuilder McKay.

== History ==
=== Construction ===
Shortly before his assassination, U.S. President Abraham Lincoln authorized the construction of Essex, but her construction was delayed for several years. On 10 February 1873 a Congressional act was approved. This act gave authority to the Secretary of the Navy to construct eight war vessels. The act stated that the four vessels should be built by the lowest responsible bidders for the contract in public competition. Donald McKay won the contract to build two of the four vessels, these were USS Adams and USS Essex. Adams and Essex were sister ships, and both of them were built by the Kitter Naval Yard.

Essex's keel was laid in 1874, and she was launched in 1876. Essex had a length of 185 feet (56 m), her beam was 35 feet (11 m) and her draft was 14.3 feet (4.4 m). Her gross register tonnage was 615 tons. She displaced 1,375 long tons (1,397 t) of water. USS Essex's engine was a 505 horsepower (377 kW) fore and aft compound steam engine that was built by the Atlantic Engine Works of Boston, Massachusetts, and she had a single water tube boiler built by Babcock & Wilcox. Essex was originally equipped with one 11-inch (280 mm) cannon, four nine-inch (230 mm) Dahlgren guns and a 60-pounder (127mm) cannon. Essex had a very bluff appearance; she had a figurehead, a moderate tumble home and a shapely rounded stern. She also had a bowsprit, a jib boom and also a flying jib boom. USS Essex was also believed to have copper sheathing on her bottom. She had two iron folding stock anchors at her bow. She carried six lifeboats that were chained to davits that were pointing outward from the main deck. Her retractable smokestack was positioned directly in front of the central mainmast. Essex was propelled by both steam and sail.

=== Ocean service ===
After being commissioned, she was placed in the command of Commander Winfield Scott Schley; and she later reported to the North Atlantic Squadron. During the year of 1877 Essex cruised to Liberia and along the west coast of Africa and in 1878–79 joined the South Atlantic Squadron. While at Monrovia, Liberia, on 31 October 1877, Ordinary Seaman John Millmore and First Class Fireman Henry Lakin Simpson rescued a shipmate from drowning, for which they were later awarded the Medal of Honor. Essex sailed on the Pacific Station from November 1881 to December 1882 and thence on the Asiatic Station for two years during which she took on board Captain S. H. Morrison and crew members of the shipwrecked Ranier. Following repairs she returned to the Asiatic Station under command of Commander T.F. Jewell in June 1886 and in October anchored at Ponape, Caroline Islands, to afford protection to American missionaries during a native uprising. She returned to New York via the Suez Canal and was placed out of commission in May 1889.

Regarded as one of the finest ships of the fleet, Essex was designated next as a training ship. A three-month cruise with cadets at the Naval Academy at Annapolis in 1893 was followed by two lengthy tours to train naval apprentices (January 1894–April 1898, and September 1898 to December 1903.)

=== Great Lakes service ===
From 1904 to 1916 the Navy Department loaned Essex to the Ohio Naval Militia. Lieutenant Anthony E. Nicklett of the Toledo Naval Militia decided to transfer Essex to the Toledo reserves. She was accepted, and plans were made to transfer her to the Toledo reserves. During her service on the Great Lakes Essex mostly used her sails because her engines were badly deteriorated. On one of her voyages she nearly collided with an ocean liner in dense fog. On another of her trips Essex ran aground in the mouth of the Saguenay River about 100 miles (160 km) from Quebec. A 15 August 1904, issue of the Toledo Blade described the event:

The pilot had gone aboard the tow tug when suddenly the Essex struck bottom in a spot where there are a large number of boulders, dangerous at all times. The tide commenced to lower soon after the ship struck and she gradually careened as the water commenced to fall, until her lights were under. Excitement reigned supreme but the best of order was maintained throughout. At noon that day the tide again rose until, when at its height, the vessel floated free. She did not get free, however, without assistance from the tug....

After being brought to into the Great Lakes from the Atlantic Ocean, General Critchfield ordered the Toledo reserves to cruise in Essex on Lake Erie if they wanted to. On 22 July 1904, while in Montreal, Quebec, Essex was joined by Captain Edward McNelly, who became her first captain on the Lakes. She was handed over to him by Lieutenant Anthony Nicklett. In 1910 her fore and aft compound engine was replaced with a triple expansion steam engine and her sail rig was reduced to two pole masts. In 1927 Essex was transferred to the Naval Reserve of the State of Minnesota. In 1928 Essex's engine and her boilers were removed, she also had her deck housed over. After this conversion she was used as a receiving ship for the Minnesota Naval Militia and the U.S. Naval Reserve.

=== End of service ===
Essex served the Minnesota Naval Militia for three years after which she was stricken from the Navy list on 27 October 1930. Essex was sold for scrap on 23 December 1930. The navy sold her for $400 (equivalent to $7,709 in 2025) to A.J. Klatzky who was the president of the Klatzky Iron and Metal Company. At the time she was sold Essex was the oldest steamer on the Navy's list. On 22 November 1930, the Detroit Free Press wrote a lament to the old vessel:

On December 17 initial steps to divorce her from the navy will be instituted when she is offered to the highest bidder adjudged capable of treating her kindly in her old age.

The Klatzky Brothers stripped Essex and sold some of her pieces to former officers and enlisted men throughout the country. On 13 October 1931, Essex was towed to the lake side of Minnesota Point where she was set on fire with 200 gallons of kerosene, and by the morning of 14 October 1931, Essex had burned to the waterline. Two heavy steel cables held her so that the wind could not blow her out into Lake Superior. The remains of Essex were pulled up onto the beach so that her hull could continue to burn; any metals (such as spikes, nails, or drift pins) were also recovered for scrap. The Klatzky Brothers intended to burn away enough of Essex's hull to pull it onto the shoreline.

=== Hulk ===
The partial wreck of Essex, intentionally burned to the waterline, lies on the shoreline of Lake Superior on Minnesota Point about one-third of a mile northwest of the Superior Harbor entrance. 50 feet (15 m) of Essex's hull bottom lies partially submerged in four feet (1.2 m) of water, with a very small piece of the wreck buried in sand. Her wreck consists of her hull bottom, her keelson, sister keelson, rider keelson, bits of her frame and some hull and ceiling planks. Remains of her engine mount are also present on the site. The partial surviving hulk is the only known remnant of the work of Donald McKay.

The USS Essex Shipwreck Site was listed on the National Register of Historic Places in 1994 for its state-level significance in the themes of engineering, historic archaeology, and maritime history.

== Gallery ==
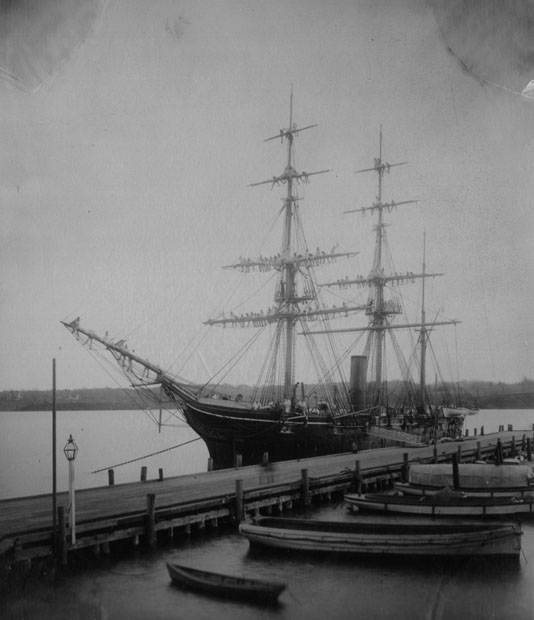
USS Essex training midshipmen at Annapolis, ca. 1893–1896

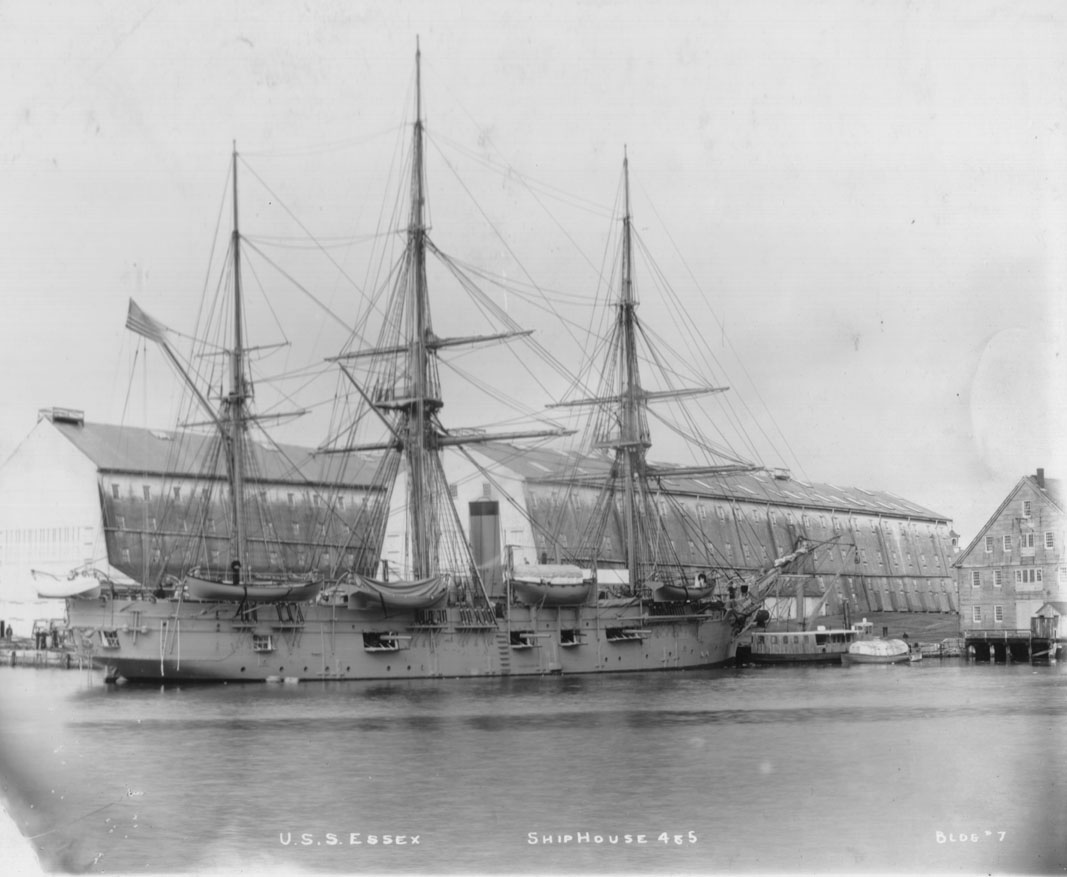
USS Essex circa 1898

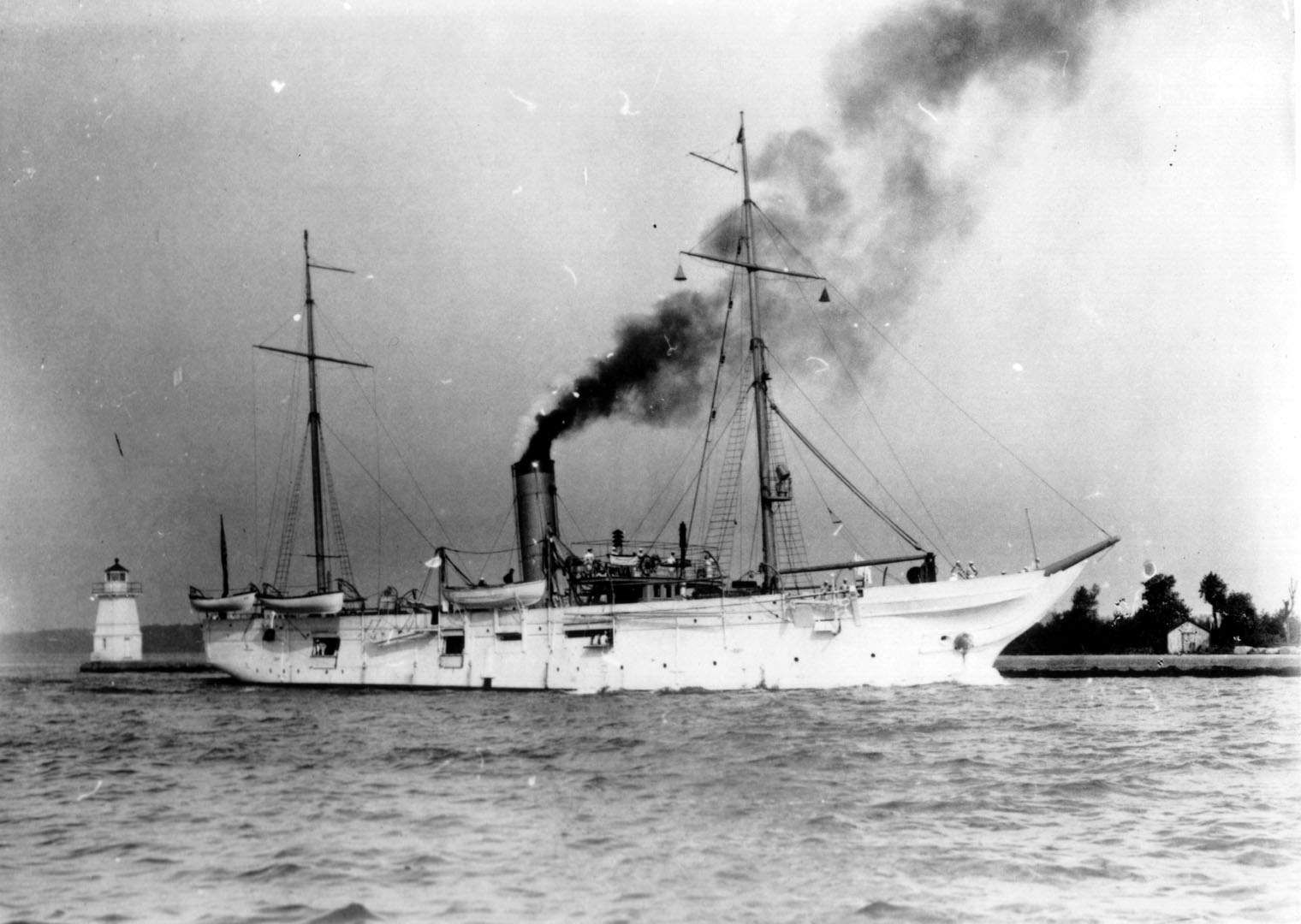
USS Essex (IX-10) in 1913, showing the changes made to her in 1910

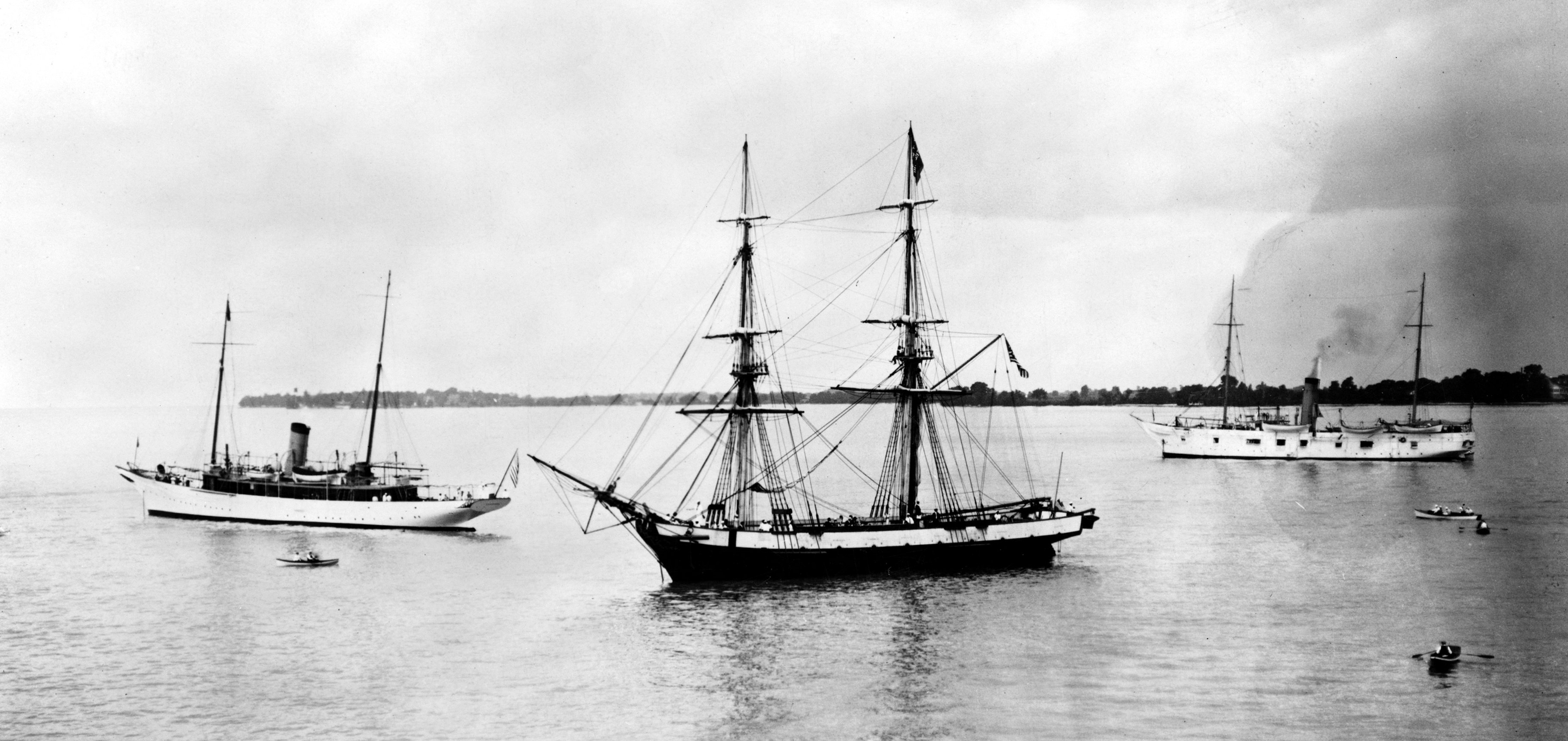
USS Essex (on right) at Put-in-Bay, Ohio, for the Perry Centennial in 1913
