= George McCall Courts =

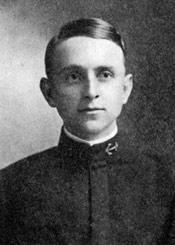
- Courts as a U.S. Naval Academy midshipman
- Born: February 16, 1888; District of Columbia, U.S.
- Died: August 1, 1932 (aged 44); Newport, Rhode Island, U.S.
- Burial place: Arlington National Cemetery
- Military career
- Allegiance: United States of America
- Branch: United States Navy
- Service years: 1907–1932
- Rank: Commander
- Unit: USS Florida
- Awards: Medal of Honor

George McCall Courts (February 16, 1888 – August 1, 1932) was born in the District of Columbia. He graduated from the United States Naval Academy in 1907. He received the Medal of Honor for actions at the United States occupation of Veracruz, 1914.

== Medal of Honor citation ==
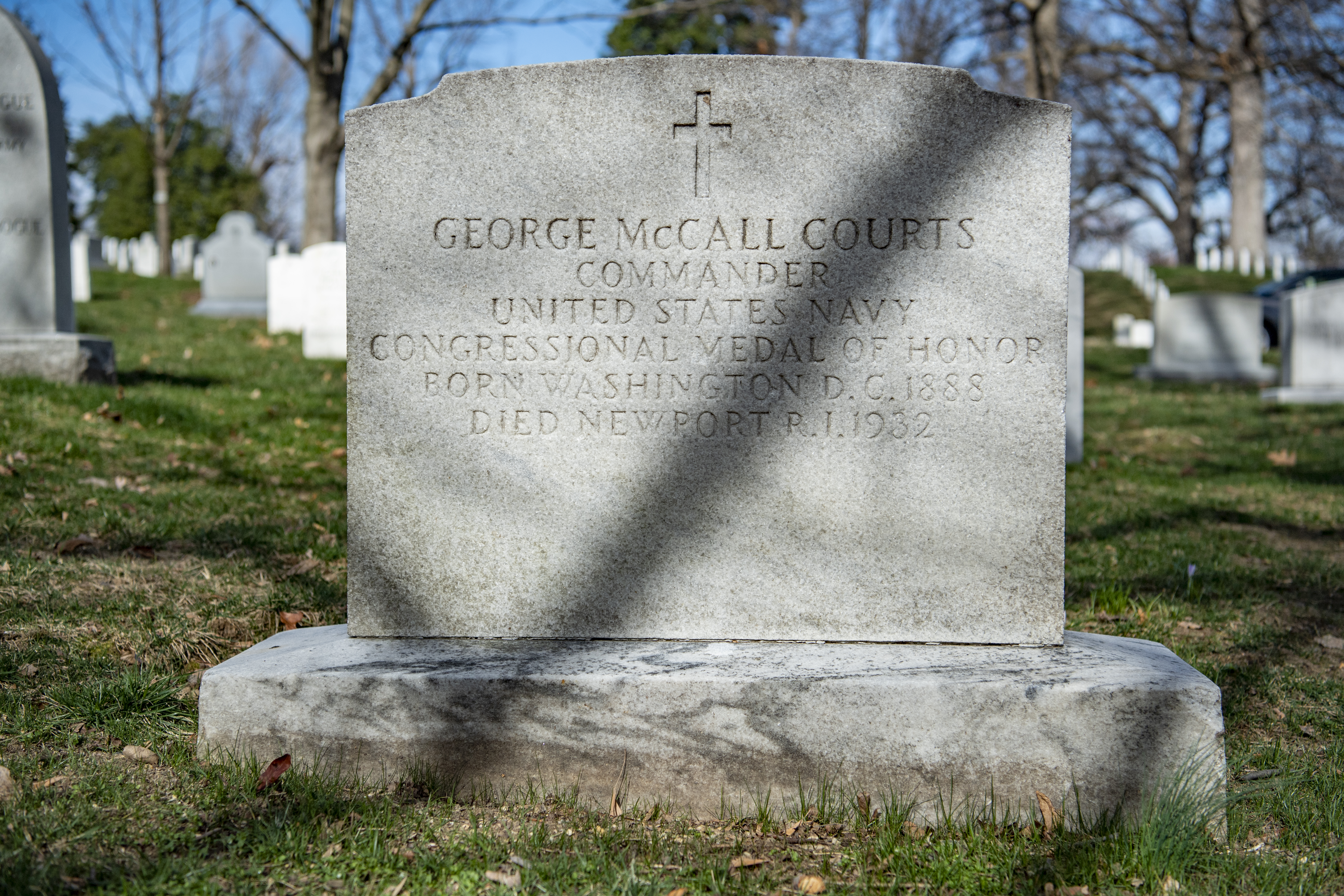
Grave at Arlington National Cemetery

Rank and organization: Lieutenant, Junior Grade Organization: U.S. Navy Born:16 February 1888, Washington, D.C. Accredited to: District of Columbia Date of issue: 12/04/1915

Citation:

For distinguished conduct in battle, engagements of Vera Cruz, 21 and 22 April 1914. Under fire, Lt.(j.g.) Courts was eminent and conspicuous in the performance of his duties. He had well qualified himself by thorough study during his years of duty in Mexico to deal with the conditions of this engagement, and his services were of great value. He twice volunteered and passed in an open boat through the zone of fire to convey important orders to the Chester, then under a severe fire.

== See also ==
- List of Medal of Honor recipients (Veracruz)
- List of United States Naval Academy alumni (Medal of Honor)
