= Adolphus Staton =

American Medal of Honor recipient (1879–1964)

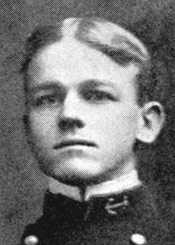
- Staton as a U.S. Naval Academy midshipman
- Born: August 28, 1879; Tarboro, North Carolina, US
- Died: June 4, 1964 (aged 84); Chevy Chase, Maryland, US
- Burial place: Arlington National Cemetery
- Military career
- Allegiance: United States
- Branch: United States Navy
- Service years: 1902–1937; 1942–1943
- Rank: Rear Admiral
- Commands: USS Nevada; Destroyer Squadron 6, Battle Fleet; USS Black Hawk; USS Asheville
- Conflicts: Battle of Veracruz (1914); World War I World War II
- Awards: Medal of Honor; Navy Cross

Adolphus Staton (August 28, 1879 – June 4, 1964) was born in Tarboro, North Carolina, and died in Chevy Chase, Maryland. He graduated from the United States Naval Academy in 1902.

He received the Medal of Honor for actions at the United States occupation of Veracruz, 1914. Staton was awarded the Navy Cross in World War I for his actions when his ship, the USS Mount Vernon, was torpedoed. He worked in Naval Intelligence and attended the Naval War College and Army War College in addition to earning a law degree from George Washington University Law School. Staton retired in 1937 but was recalled to active duty during World War II. He is buried at Arlington National Cemetery.

== Biography ==
From 1896 to 1897, Staton attended the Virginia Military Institute before enrolling at the University of North Carolina. He left to enter the Naval Academy in 1898.

Staton was promoted to lieutenant commander on August 1, 1915. While serving in the office of the Judge Advocate General, he graduated from the George Washington University Law School in 1917. During World War I, Staton received a temporary promotion to commander on July 1, 1918 which was made permanent effective July 1, 1919. From 1921 to 1922, he attended the Naval War College.

From 1923 to 1924, Staton was commanding officer of the gunboat Asheville. From May 1924 to July 1926, he was commander of the destroyer tender Black Hawk. Staton was promoted to captain effective June 4, 1925. From 1926 to 1929, he was assigned to the Bureau of Navigation in Washington, D.C.

From 1929 to 1931, Staton was commander of Destroyer Squadron 6, Battle Fleet. From 1931 to 1932, he attended the Army War College. From December 1933 to June 1935, Staton was commanding officer of the battleship Nevada. From 1935 to 1937, he taught at the Army Command and General Staff College.

Staton retired from active duty on June 30, 1937 and was advanced to rear admiral on the retired list. He was recalled to active duty during World War II, serving in the office of the Under Secretary of the Navy.

After retirement, Staton lived in Chevy Chase, Maryland. He died at his home there on June 4, 1964.

== Medal of Honor citation ==
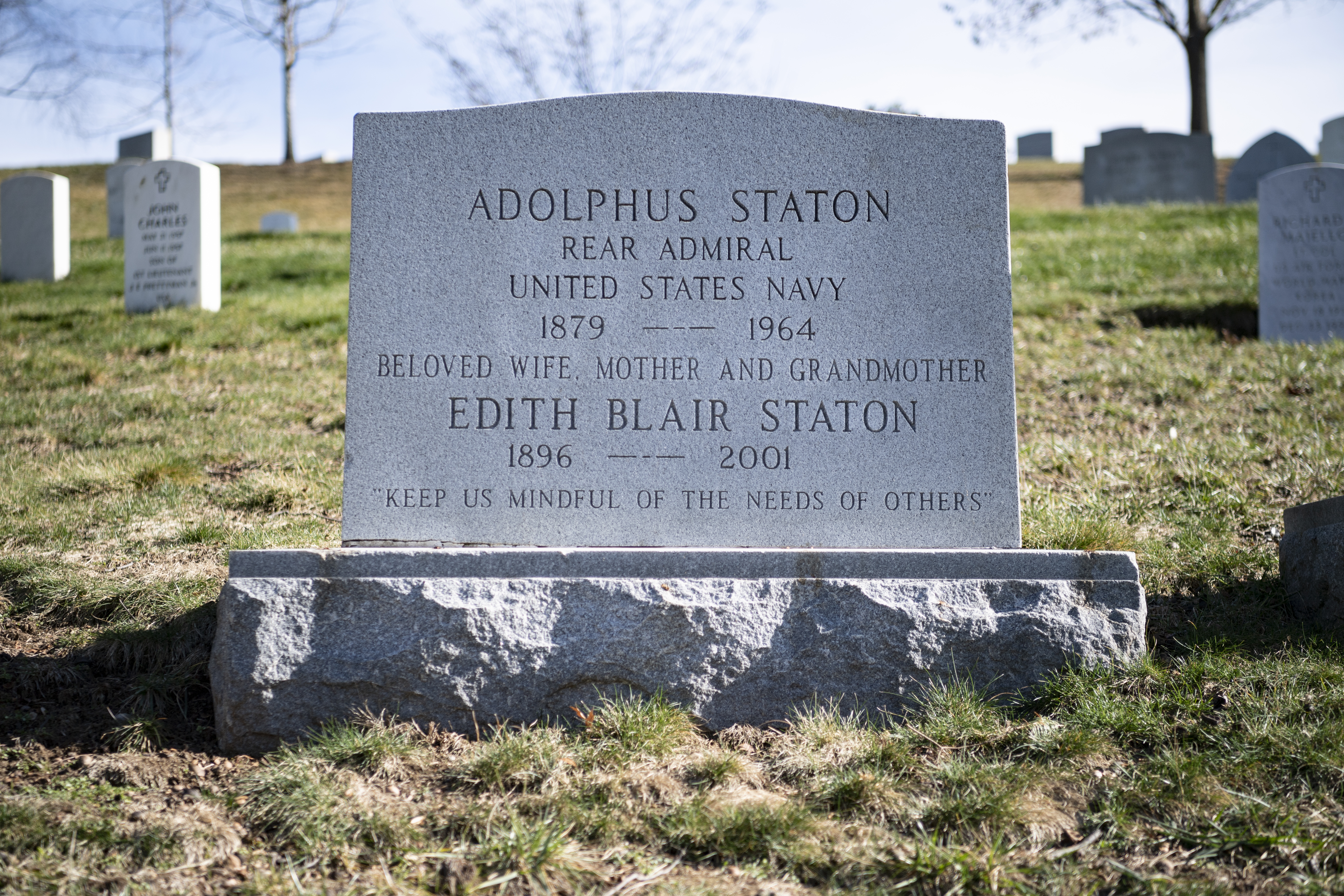
Grave at Arlington National Cemetery

Rank and organization: Lieutenant Organization: U.S. Navy Born: 28 August 1879, Tarboro, N.C. Accredited to: North Carolina Place/Date: Vera Cruz, Mexico, 22 April 1914

Citation:

For distinguished conduct in battle, engagement of Vera Cruz, 22 April 1914; was eminent and conspicuous in command of his battalion. He exhibited courage and skill in leading his men through the action of the 22d and in the final occupation of the city.

== Navy Cross citation ==
Commander Staton was awarded the Navy Cross on September 23, 1919.

Citation:

For distinguished service in the line of his profession as executive officer of the U. S. S. Mount Vernon when that vessel was torpedoed on September 5, 1918. The discipline manifested by the officers and crew of the Mount Vernon was excellent, and it is considered that the high state of efficiency found to prevail under the trying conditions of the torpedoing and subsequently was largely due to the energy and zeal of this officer.

== Family ==
Staton was the son of Dr. Lycurgus Lafayette Staton and his wife Katherine E. (Baker) Staton. He had an older brother and a younger sister.

On July 28, 1917, Staton married Edith Draper Blair (September 6, 1896 – June 30, 2001) in Silver Spring, Maryland. She was the granddaughter of William F. Draper and Montgomery Blair. Staton and his wife had one daughter.

== Gallery ==
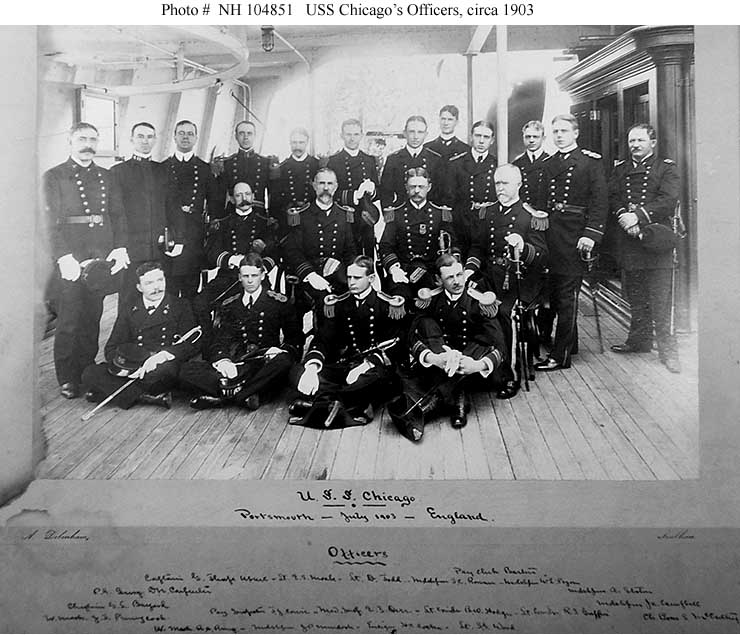
Staton as a midshipman, standing third from the right in the back row in this photograph of the officers of the protected cruiser USS Chicago, ca. 1903.

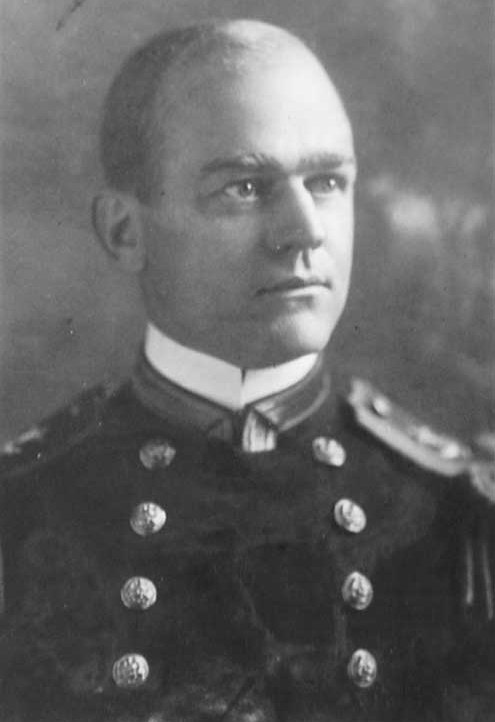
Staton as a lieutenant, ca. 1914.

== See also ==
- List of Medal of Honor recipients (Veracruz)
- List of United States Naval Academy alumni (Medal of Honor)
