= List of Medal of Honor recipients educated at the United States Naval Academy =

CMOH Recipients from USNA

The United States Naval Academy is an undergraduate college in Annapolis, Maryland with the mission of educating and commissioning officers for the United States Navy and Marine Corps. The Academy is often referred to as Annapolis, while sports media refer to the Academy as "Navy" and the students as "Midshipmen"; this usage is officially endorsed. During the latter half of the 19th century and the first decades of the 20th, the United States Naval Academy was the primary source of U.S. Navy and Marine Corps officers, with the Class of 1881 being the first to provide officers to the Marine Corps. Graduates of the Academy are also given the option of entering the United States Army or United States Air Force. Most Midshipmen are admitted through the congressional appointment system. The curriculum emphasizes various fields of engineering.

This list is drawn from alumni of the Naval Academy who are recipients of the Medal of Honor (MOH), the highest military decoration awarded by the United States government. The Academy was founded in 1845 and graduated its first class in 1846. The first alumnus to graduate and go on to receive the Medal of Honor was Harry L. Hawthorne (class of 1882). The most recent alumnus to receive the Medal of Honor was John Ripley (Class of 1962), who posthumously received the award in 2026. Two alumni, Orion P. Howe (class of 1870) and Henry Lakin Simpson (class of 1882), received the Medal of Honor before being appointed to the Academy.

At the Naval Academy, in Bancroft Hall, twenty-one rooms are dedicated to each Academy graduate Medal of Honor recipient since the start of World War II.

In addition to the 73 Medal of Honor recipients who are alumni of the Academy, over 990 noted scholars from a variety of academic fields are Academy graduates, including 56 Rhodes Scholars and 34 Marshall Scholars. Additional notable graduates include 1 President of the United States and 2 Nobel Prize recipients.

== Medal of Honor recipients ==
"Class year" refers to the alumni's class year, which usually is the same year they graduated. However, in times of war, classes often graduate early. For example, the Class of 1943 actually graduated in 1942.

=== Spanish–American War ===
Name / Class year / Notability / References; Richmond Pearson Hobson / 1889 / Rear Admiral; recipient of the Medal of Honor for attempting to block a channel during the Spanish–American War, where he was taken prisoner; Representative from Alabama (1907–1915)

=== Veracruz ===
Name	Class year	Notability	References
Frank Friday Fletcher	1875	Rear Admiral; recipient of the Medal of Honor for commanding landing operations during the United States occupation of Veracruz in April 1914; the Fletcher-class destroyer was named after him; uncle of Frank Jack Fletcher	
William R. Rush	1877	Captain; recipient of the Medal of Honor for commanding landing operations during the United States occupation of Veracruz in April 1914	
Harry M. P. Huse	1878	Vice-Admiral; recipient of the Medal of Honor for leadership in shortening the conflict during the United States occupation of Veracruz in April 1914	
Edwin Anderson, Jr.	1882	Admiral; recipient of the Medal of Honor for leadership as commanding officer of USS New Hampshire, and while leading ground units during the United States occupation of Veracruz in April 1914	
Herman Osman Stickney	1888	Rear Admiral; recipient of the Medal of Honor for actions as gun captain on board USS Prairie during the United States occupation of Veracruz in April 1914	
William Kelly Harrison	1889	Recipient of the Medal of Honor for actions during the United States occupation of Veracruz in April 1914	
Albertus W. Catlin	1890	Brigadier General, USMC; recipient of the Medal of Honor for bravery in ground combat operations during the United States occupation of Veracruz in April 1914	
William A. Moffett	1890	Rear Admiral; pioneer of Naval aviation; first Chief of the Navy's Bureau of Aeronautics, Moffett Federal Airfield named after him; recipient of the Medal of Honor for night operations aboard USS Chester during the United States occupation of Veracruz in April 1914	
Wendell Cushing Neville	1890	Major General, USMC; recipient of the Medal of Honor for leadership during ground combat during the landings at United States occupation of Veracruz in April 1914; Commandant of the Marine Corps (1929–1930)	
Rufus Zenas Johnston	1895	Rear Admiral; recipient of the Medal of Honor for actions during the United States occupation of Veracruz in April 1914	
Allen Buchanan	1899	Commander; recipient of the Medal of Honor for actions during the United States occupation of Veracruz in April 1914	
Guy W. S. Castle	1901	Commander; pioneer of submarine service as commanding officer of USS Plunger and USS Porpoise; recipient of the Medal of Honor for leadership during the landings at Veracruz in April 1914	
James Patrick Lannon	1902	Rear Admiral; recipient of the Medal of Honor for actions during the United States occupation of Veracruz in April 1914	
Adolphus Staton	1902	Rear Admiral; recipient of the Medal of Honor for actions during the United States occupation of Veracruz in April 1914	
Julius Curtis Townsend	1902	Rear Admiral; recipient of the Medal of Honor for actions during the United States occupation of Veracruz in April 1914	
Richard Wainwright	1902	Commander; recipient of the Medal of Honor for actions in ground combat during the United States occupation of Veracruz in April 1914; sailed with the Great White Fleet (1907–1909)	
Frederick V. McNair, Jr.	1903	Captain; recipient of the Medal of Honor for actions in occupying the city during the United States occupation of Veracruz in April 1914; son of Admiral Frederick V. McNair, Sr. (class of 1857); grandfather of tennis champion Frederick V. McNair, IV	
Frank Jack Fletcher	1906	Admiral; recipient of the Medal of Honor for saving hundreds of refugees during the United States occupation of Veracruz in April 1914; operational commander at the pivotal Battles of Coral Sea and of Midway in World War II; nephew of Admiral Frank Friday Fletcher	
Charles Conway Hartigan	1906	Rear Admiral; recipient of the Medal of Honor for actions during the United States occupation of Veracruz in April 1914	
George McCall Courts	1907	Commander; recipient of the Medal of Honor for actions during the United States occupation of Veracruz in April 1914	
Jonas H. Ingram	1907	Admiral; recipient of the Medal of Honor for actions in handling an artillery and machine gun battalion during the United States occupation of Veracruz in April 1914; Navy Cross recipient for actions during World War I; commander, United States Atlantic Fleet during World War II; football player and head football coach at the Academy	
Theodore S. Wilkinson	1909	Vice-Admiral; recipient of the Medal of Honor for actions during the United States occupation of Veracruz in April 1914; veteran of World War I and World War II; director of Office of Naval Intelligence when Pearl Harbor was attacked in 1941	
Oscar C. Badger II	1911	Admiral; recipient of the Medal of Honor for actions during the United States occupation of Veracruz in April 1914; veteran of World War I and World War II; commanding officer of USS North Carolina	
Paul Frederick Foster	1911	Vice Admiral; recipient of the Medal of Honor for actions during the United States occupation of Veracruz in April 1914	
George M. Lowry	1911	Rear Admiral; recipient of the Medal of Honor for ground actions during the United States occupation of Veracruz in April 1914; veteran of World War II	
Hugh Carroll Frazer	1912	Commander; recipient of the Medal of Honor for actions during the United States occupation of Veracruz in April 1914	
Edward Orrick McDonnell	1912	Vice Admiral; recipient of the Medal of Honor for bravery while manning a signal station during the United States occupation of Veracruz in April 1914	

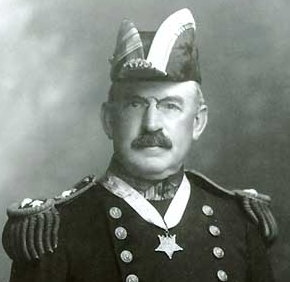
Frank Friday Fletcher

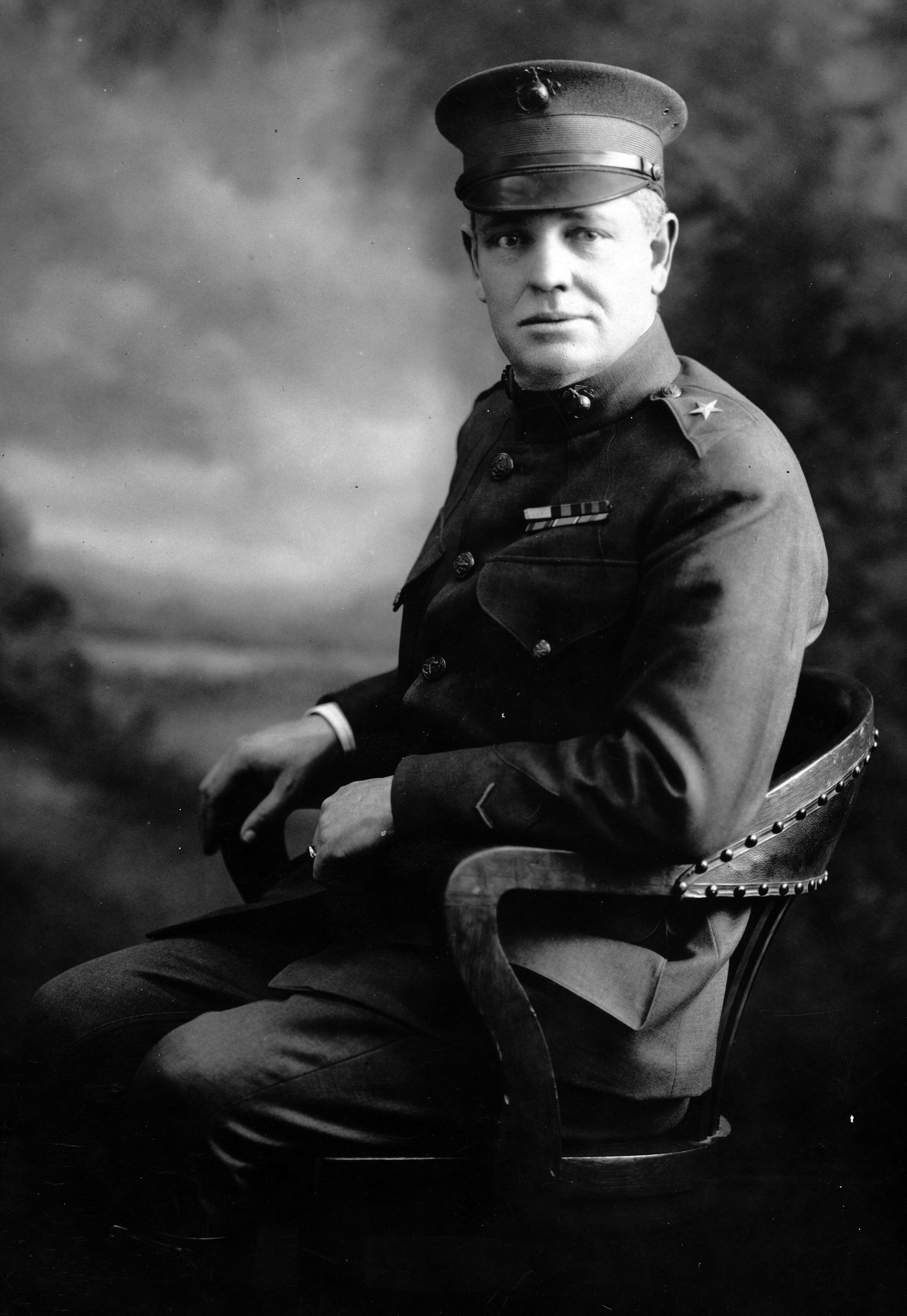
Albertus Catlin

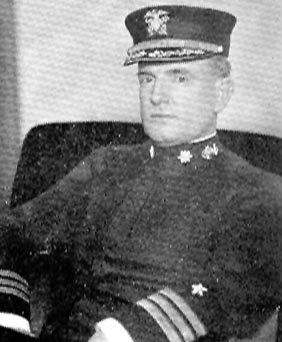
William Moffett

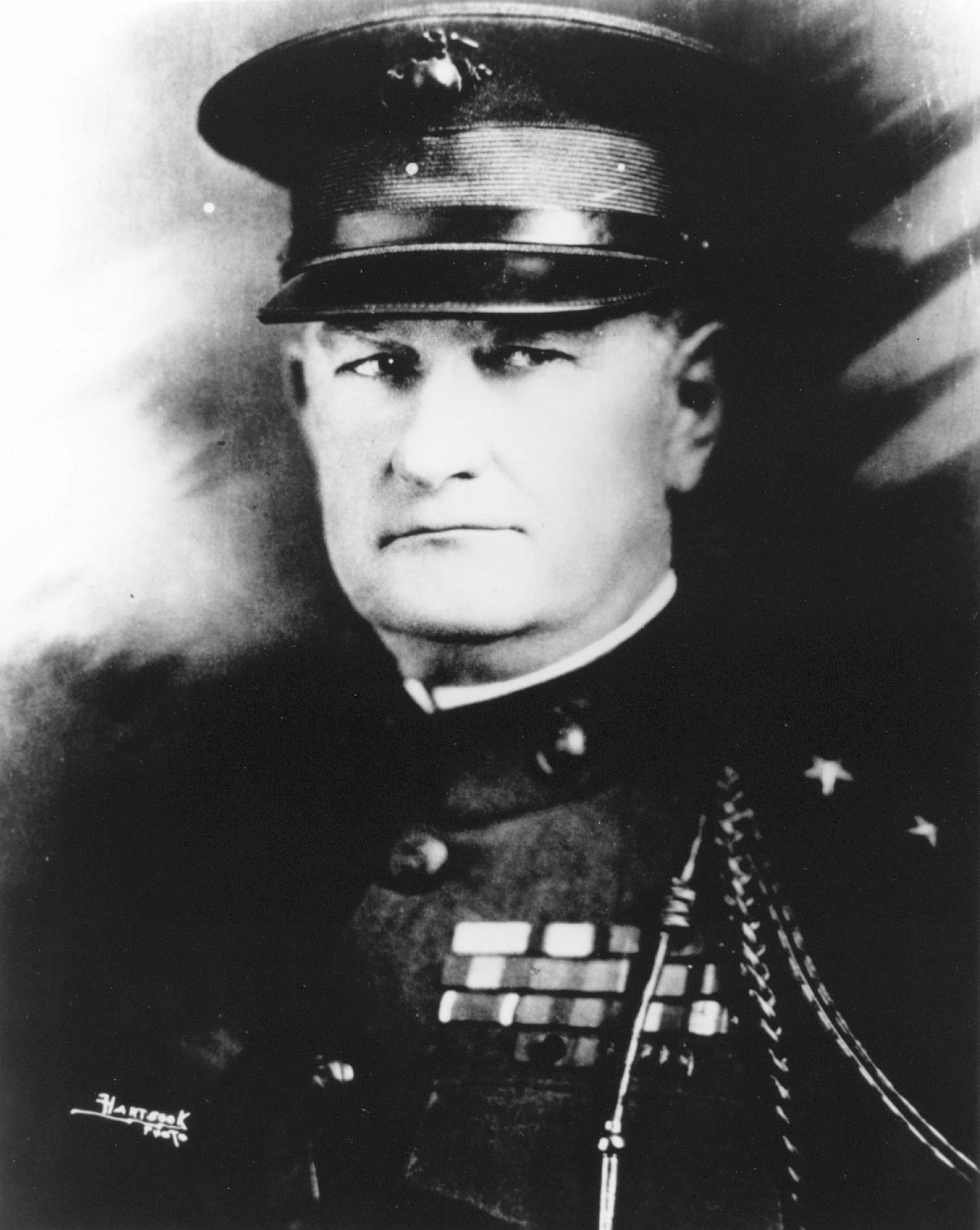
Wendell Neville

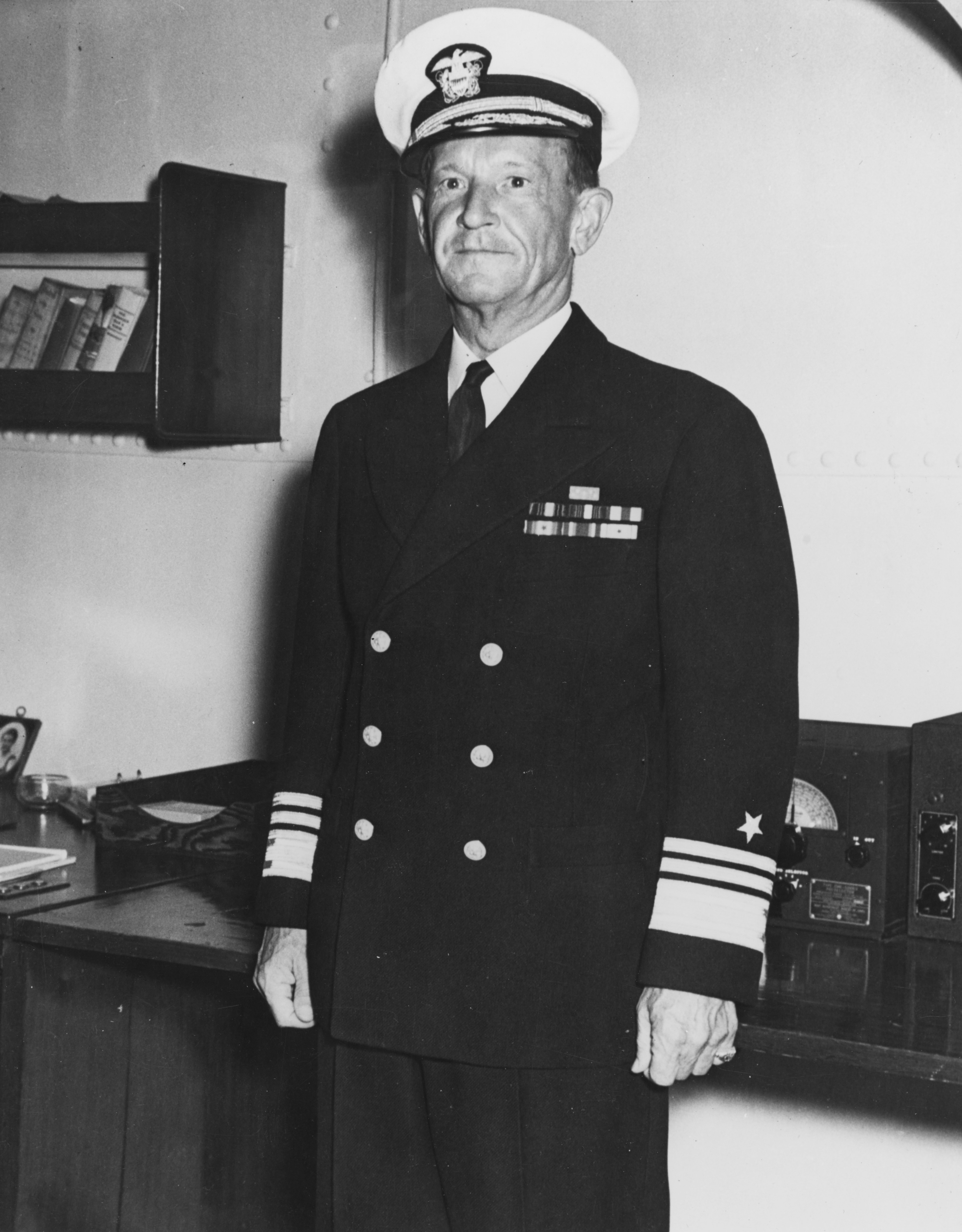
Frank Jack Fletcher

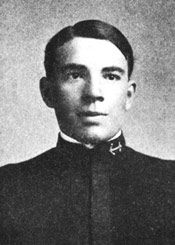
Jonas Ingram

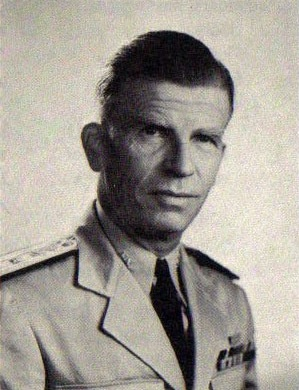
Oscar Badger

=== World War I ===
Name	Class year	Notability	References
Willis W. Bradley	1907	Captain; Governor of Guam (1929–1931); Representative from California (1947–1949); Medal of Honor recipient for actions during an ammunition explosion on board USS Pittsburgh in 1917	
Edouard Izac	1915	Representative from California (1937–1947); World War I Medal of Honor recipient; held as a prisoner of war on board a German submarine and in Germany, but escaped	

=== World War II ===
Name	Class year	Notability	References
Isaac C. Kidd	1906	Rear Admiral; recipient of the Medal of Honor posthumously for his actions on the bridge of USS Arizona during the Attack on Pearl Harbor	
Franklin Van Valkenburgh	1909	Captain; recipient of the Medal of Honor posthumously for his actions during the attack on Pearl Harbor as the last captain of USS Arizona	
Mervyn S. Bennion	1910	Captain; recipient of the Medal of Honor posthumously for his actions during the attack on Pearl Harbor while commanding, and saving from destruction, USS West Virginia	
Daniel J. Callaghan	1911	Rear Admiral; posthumous recipient of the Medal of Honor for bravery and leadership in the Naval Battle of Guadalcanal on November 13, 1942; classmate Norman Scott was his second-in-command and he also perished that night and was posthumously awarded the Medal of Honor	
Norman Scott	1911	Rear Admiral; posthumous recipient of the Medal of Honor for bravery and leadership in the Naval Battle of Guadalcanal on November 13, 1942; was second-in-command to classmate Daniel Callaghan who also perished that night and was posthumously awarded the Medal of Honor	
Albert H. Rooks	1914	Captain; posthumous recipient of the Medal of Honor for bravery and leadership in the south Pacific during a series of actions as a commanding officer of USS Houston in February 1942 against Japanese air and sea forces	
Cassin Young	1916	Captain; recipient of the Medal of Honor for actions as a commanding officer of USS Vestal during the attack on Pearl Harbor; posthumously awarded the Navy Cross for actions during the Battle of Cape Esperance and Naval Battle of Guadalcanal	
Samuel G. Fuqua	1923	Rear Admiral; recipient of the Medal of Honor for actions during the attack on USS Arizona where he directed damage control and rescue of personnel, as senior surviving officer he directed abandoning of the ship and left with the last boatload	
John P. Cromwell	1924	Captain; posthumous recipient of the Medal of Honor for actions while commander of a submarine group and on board USS Sculpin near Truk island he went down with the submarine when the crew had to abandon it	
Herbert Emery Schonland	1925	Rear Admiral; recipient of the Medal of Honor for actions as damage control officer of USS San Francisco during the Naval Battle of Guadalcanal	
Howard W. Gilmore	1926	Commander; posthumous recipient of the Medal of Honor for actions during January–February 1943 while commanding officer of USS Growler; while surfaced and on deck he ordered his submarine to dive while he remained on deck	
Bruce Van Voorhis	1929	Lieutenant Commander; posthumous recipient of the Medal of Honor for actions in the Solomon Islands he flew a 700-mile unescorted bombing/reconnaissance mission	
Harold W. Bauer	1930	Lieutenant Colonel, USMC; posthumous recipient of the Medal of Honor for actions in the Solomon Islands for shooting down 11 enemy planes	
Samuel David Dealey	1930	Commander; posthumous recipient of the Medal of Honor for actions as a commanding officer of USS Harder; recipient of four Navy Crosses	
Richard Antrim	1931	Rear Admiral; recipient of the Medal of Honor for heroism as a prisoner of war; Navy Cross recipient	
Ernest E. Evans	1931	Commander; posthumous recipient of the Medal of Honor for heroism while commanding officer of USS Johnston during the Battle off Samar; Navy Cross recipient	
Lawson P. Ramage	1931	Vice Admiral; recipient of the Medal of Honor for heroism while commanding officer of USS Parche; recipient of two Navy Crosses	
Bruce McCandless	1932	Rear Admiral; recipient of the Medal of Honor for his heroism on board USS San Francisco during the Naval Battle of Guadalcanal; father of Bruce McCandless II, astronaut, class of 1958	
John D. Bulkeley	1933	Vice Admiral; recipient of the Medal of Honor for combat actions from December 1941 – April 1942 while commanding Motor Torpedo Boat Squadron Three, which rescued General of the Army Douglas MacArthur	
David McCampbell	1933	Captain; recipient of the Medal of Honor for aerial combat during World War II; became the Navy's all-time fighter ace with 34 aerial victories	
George Fleming Davis	1934	Commander; posthumous recipient of the Medal of Honor for combat while commanding officer of USS Walke during the landings at Lingayen Gulf, Philippines	
Richard O'Kane	1934	Rear Admiral; recipient of the Medal of Honor for submarine combat during World War II on board USS Tang, also served on board USS Wahoo, participated in more successful attacks on Japanese shipping than any other fighting submarine officer during World War II	
Eugene Bennett Fluckey	1935	Rear Admiral; recipient of the Medal of Honor and four Navy Crosses for submarine combat during World War II; commander of USS Barb, which won the Presidential Unit Citation for its eighth through eleventh patrols and the Navy Unit Commendation for the twelfth patrol	
John James Powers	1935	Lieutenant; posthumous recipient of the Medal of Honor for aerial combat as a dive bomber pilot during the Battle of the Coral Sea	
Milton Ernest Ricketts	1935	Lieutenant; posthumous recipient of the Medal of Honor for actions while in charge of a damage control party on board USS Yorktown during the Battle of the Coral Sea	
Edward "Butch" O'Hare	1937	Lieutenant Commander; recipient of the Medal of Honor for aerial combat during World War II; US Navy's first ace of the war; O'Hare International Airport in Chicago named after him	
George L. Street III	1937	Captain; recipient of the Medal of Honor for actions as a commanding officer of USS Tirante in Cheju Island harbor	
Richard Miles McCool	1945	Captain; recipient of the Medal of Honor for actions while serving on board a Landing Craft Support during the Battle of Okinawa	

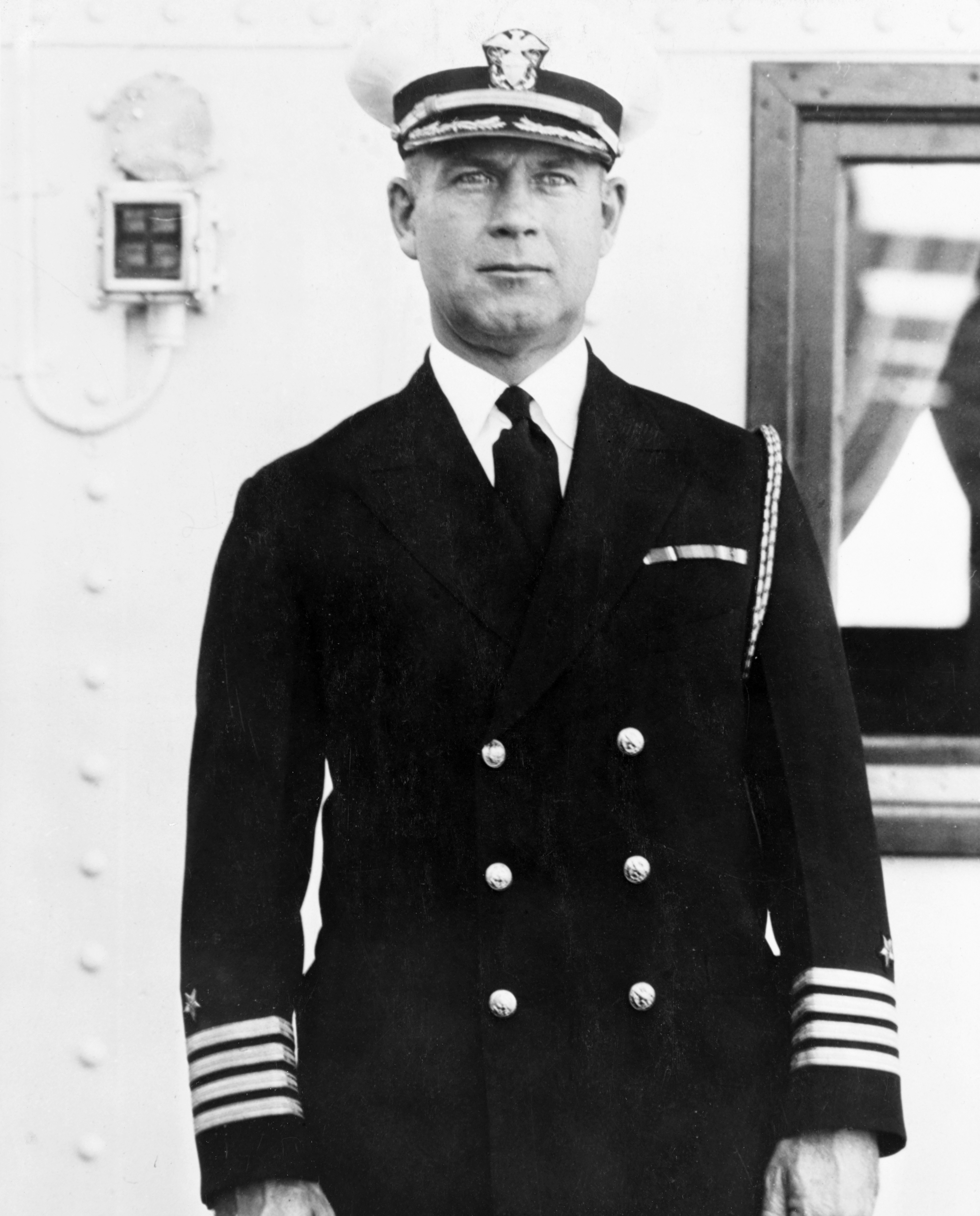
Isaac Kidd

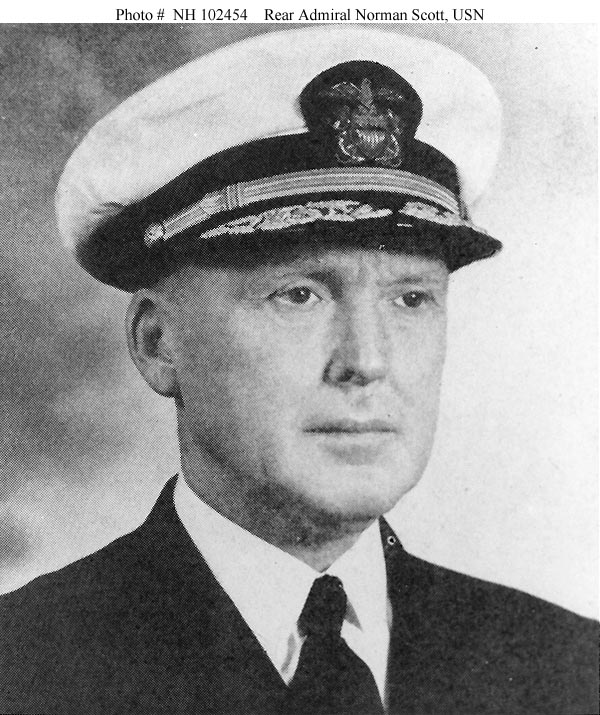
Norman Scott

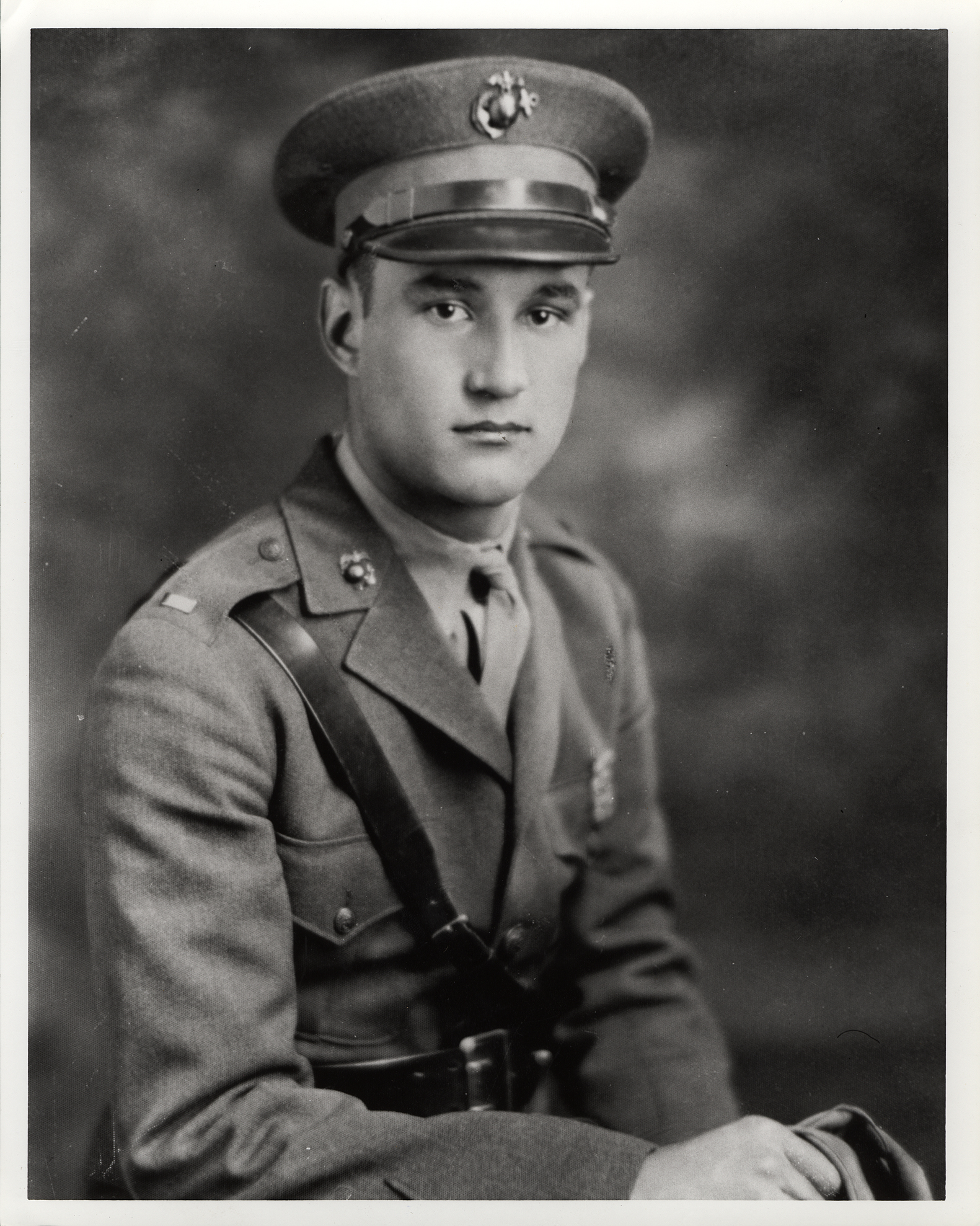
Harold Bauer

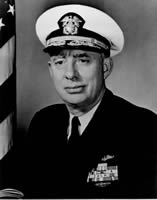
Lawson Ramage

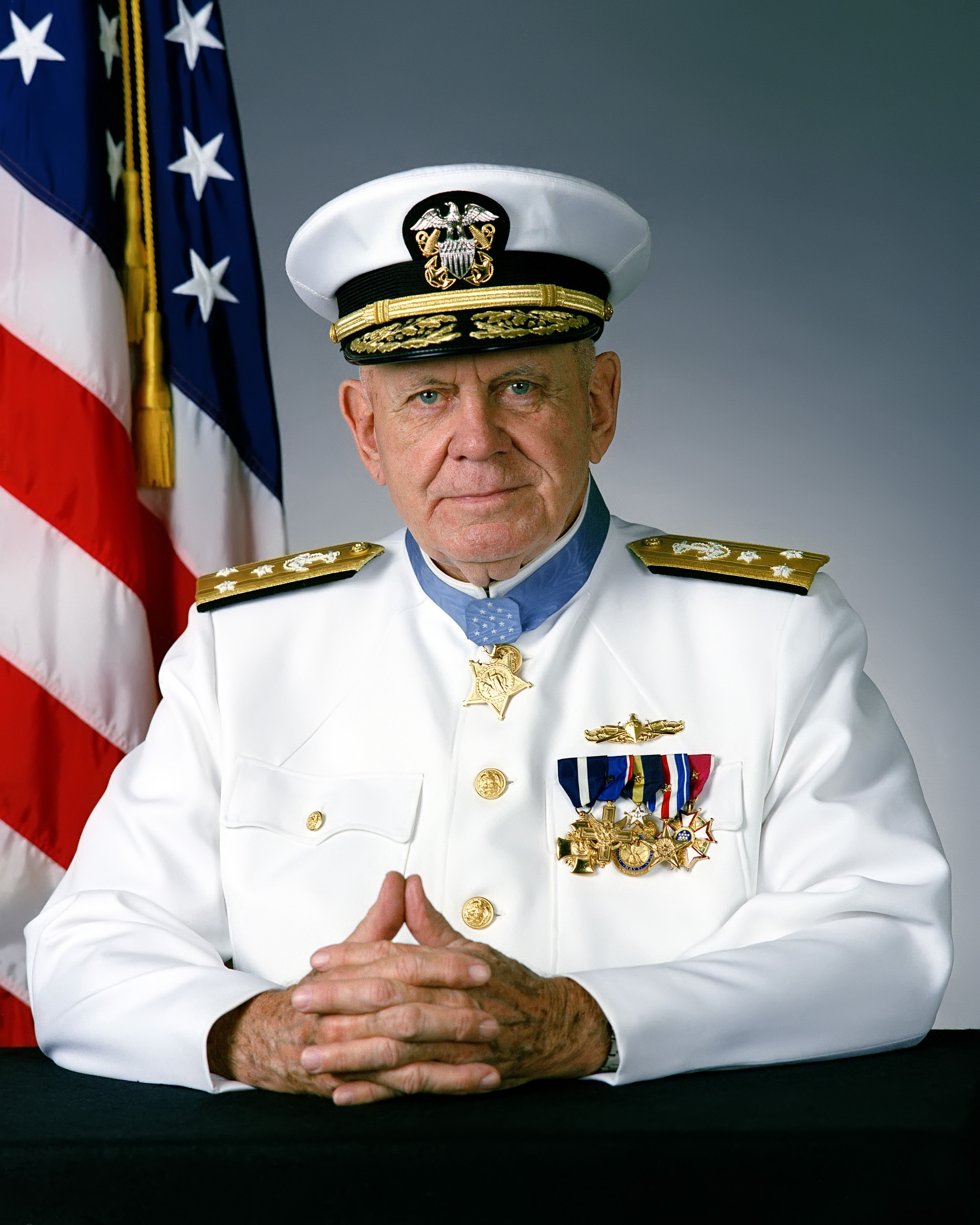
John Bulkeley

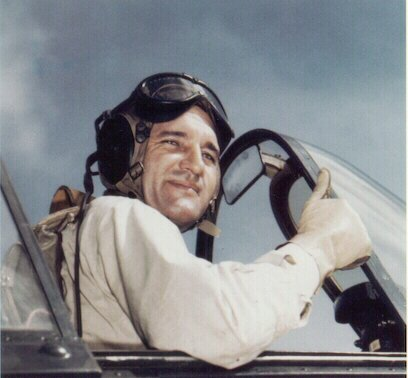
David McCampbell in his fighter plane

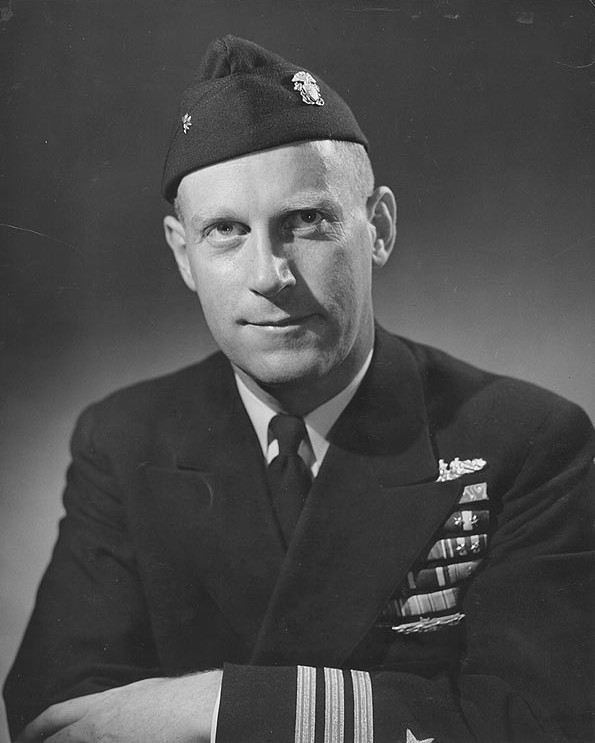
Richard O'Kane

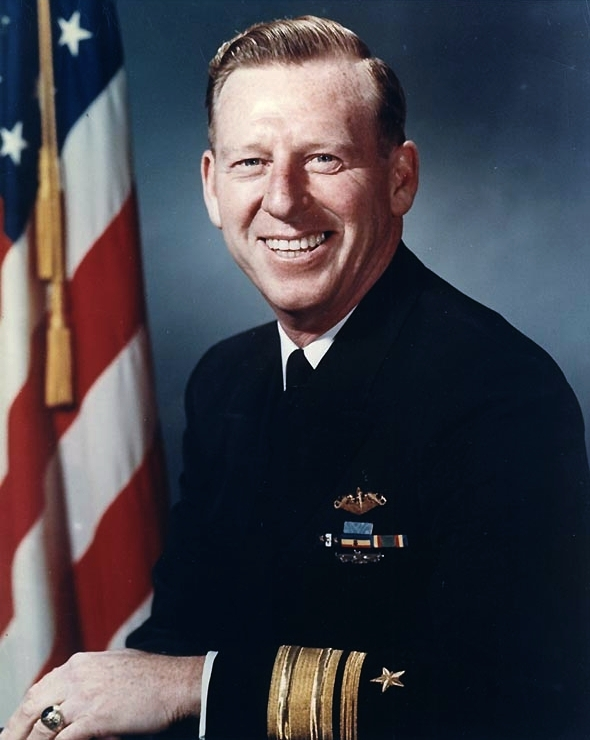
Eugene Fluckey

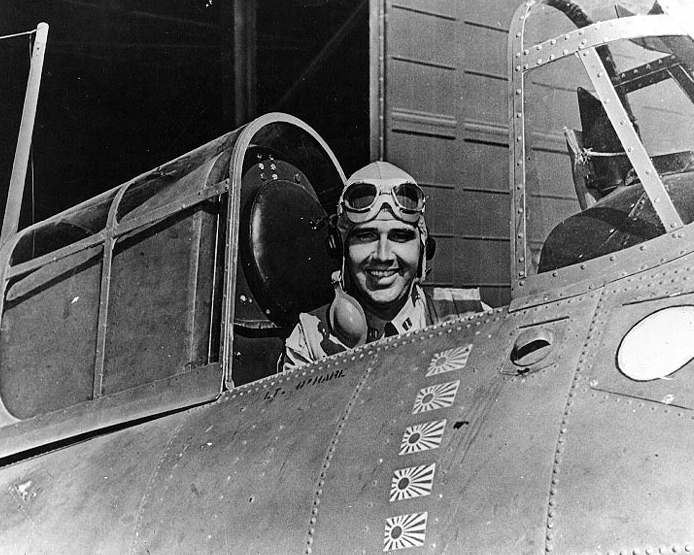
Butch O'Hare in his F4F Wildcat fighter plane

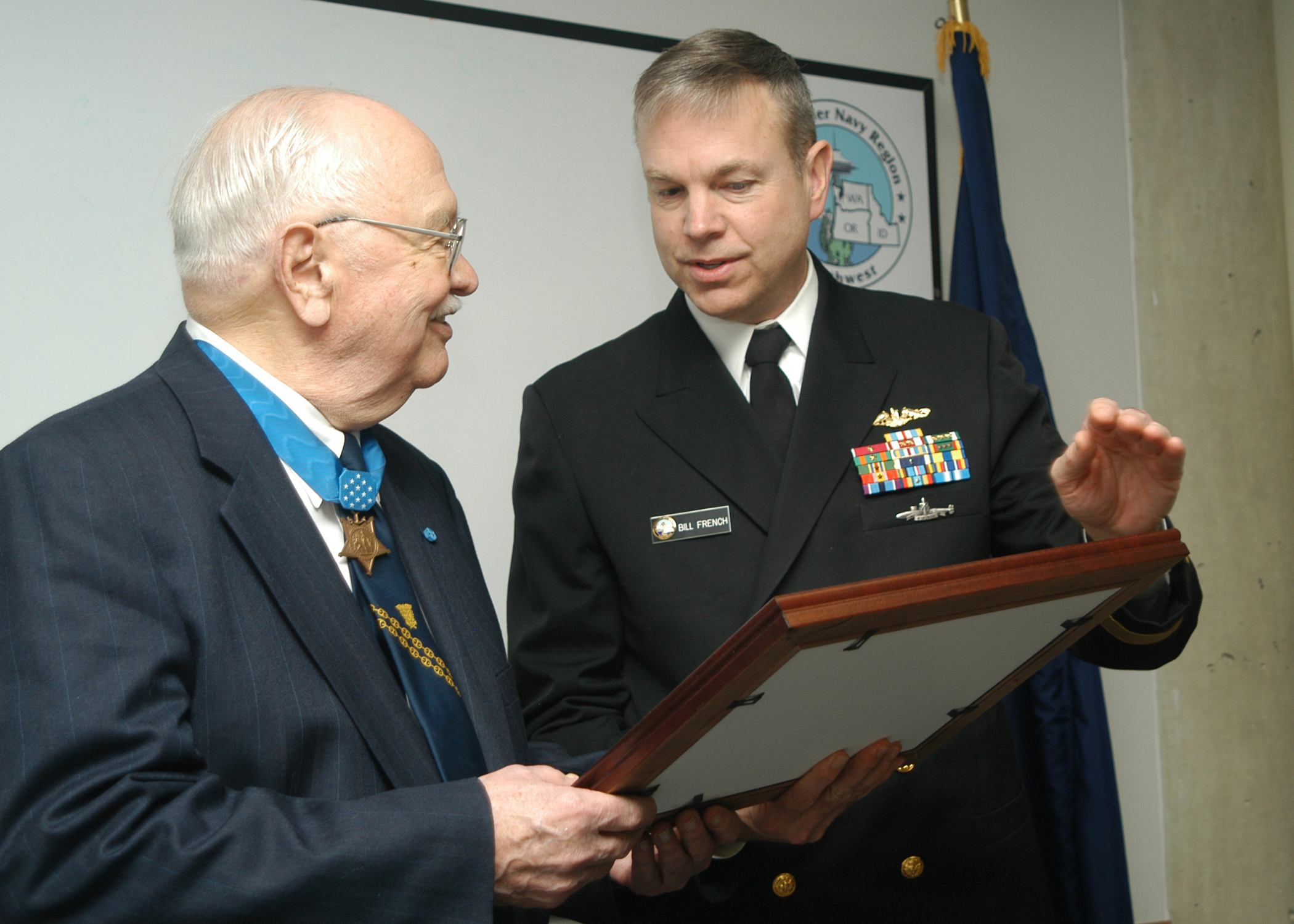
Richard McCool (l)

=== Korea ===
Name	Class year	Notability	References
Thomas J. Hudner, Jr.	1947	Captain; fighter pilot; crash-landed his plane at Chosin Reservoir attempting to save downed squadron mate Jesse L. Brown, who was the first African-American United States Naval aviator	
Baldomero Lopez	1948	1st Lieutenant; Marine Corps infantry platoon leader; posthumous recipient of the Medal of Honor for actions during the landings at Inchon	
Robert D. Reem	1948	2nd Lieutenant; Marine Corps infantry platoon leader; Medal of Honor recipient for actions at Chinhung-ni, North Korea	

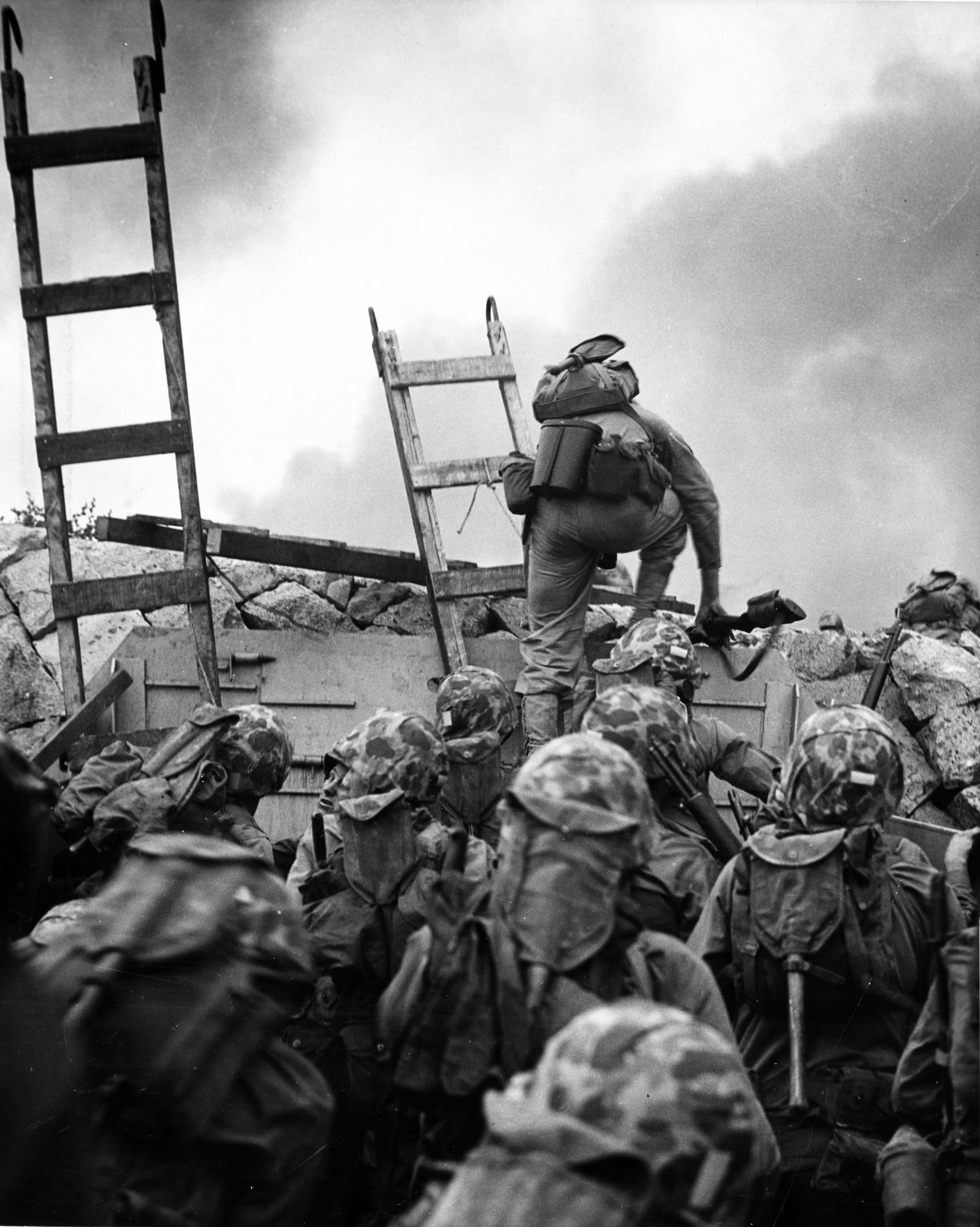
Baldomero Lopez scaling the seawall at Inchon

=== Vietnam ===
Name	Class year	Notability	References
James Stockdale	1947	Vice Admiral; Naval aviator & prisoner of war (POW); Medal of Honor recipient for actions as a POW; one of the most highly decorated officers in the history of the United States Navy; Vice-presidential candidate (Reform Party, 1992 United States presidential election)	
John Ripley	1962	Colonel; Most recent recipient of the Medal of Honor. Received the medal for his actions at the Dong Ha Bridge. Originally received the Silver Star, which was upgraded to the Medal of Honor on March 3, 2026. His family received the award on June 18th, 2026.	

=== Other recipients ===
Name	Class year	Notability	References
Orion P. Howe	1870	Recipient of the Medal of Honor as a 14-year-old drummer boy during the American Civil War; later appointed to the Academy	
Harry L. Hawthorne	1882	Colonel, United States Army; MOH for his actions at Wounded Knee	
Henry Lakin Simpson	1882	Recipient of the Medal of Honor for rescuing a man overboard; later appointed to the Academy	
Claud A. Jones	1907	Rear Admiral; recipient of the Medal of Honor for his extraordinary heroism during the destruction of USS Tennessee during a 1916 hurricane	
William M. Corry, Jr.	1910	Recipient of the Medal of Honor, posthumously, for his attempts in 1920 to rescue the pilot of a burning plane in which he had been a passenger; Corry Station Naval Technical Training Center and three destroyers have been named in his honor	
Walter Atlee Edwards	1910	Lieutenant Commander; Medal of Honor recipient for saving 482 people from a burning transport in the Sea of Marmara, Turkey in 1922	
Richard E. Byrd	1912	Rear Admiral; Arctic and Antarctic explorer; Medal of Honor recipient for aerial and Arctic explorations; assistant to Officer In Charge, Navy Recruiting Bureau	
Robert Webster Cary	1914	Rear Admiral; recipient of the Medal of Honor for his bravery during a boiler explosion on board USS California in 1915; veteran of World War I and World War II; Navy Cross recipient; recipient of five Legions of Merit	
Thomas J. Ryan	1921	Rear Admiral; Medal of Honor recipient for actions during the 1923 Great Kantō earthquake in Yokohama, Japan; World War II destroyer flotilla commander	
Henry Clay Drexler	1924	Ensign; posthumous Medal of Honor recipient for actions following a gun turret explosion on board USS Trenton in 1924	
Carlton B. Hutchins	1926	Lieutenant; posthumous Medal of Honor recipient for actions following a mid-air collision with another Consolidated PBY Catalina seaplane where his piloting allowed the rest of his crew to parachute to safety	

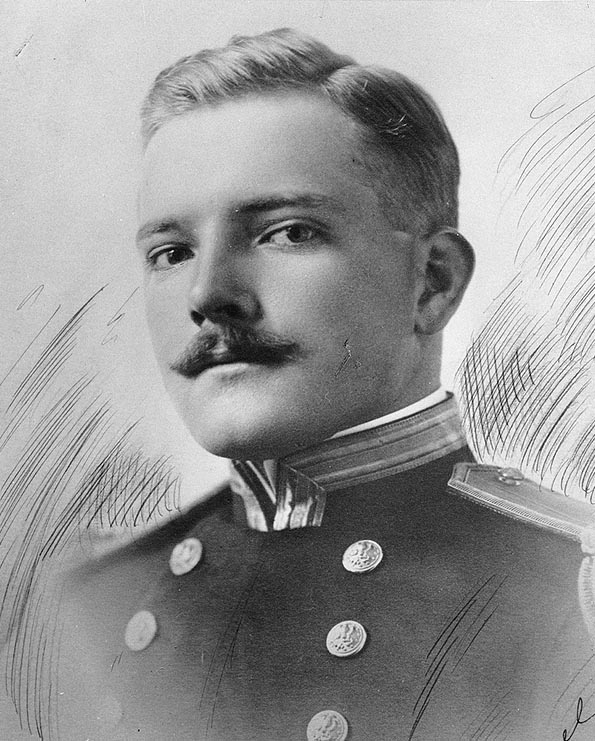
William Corry

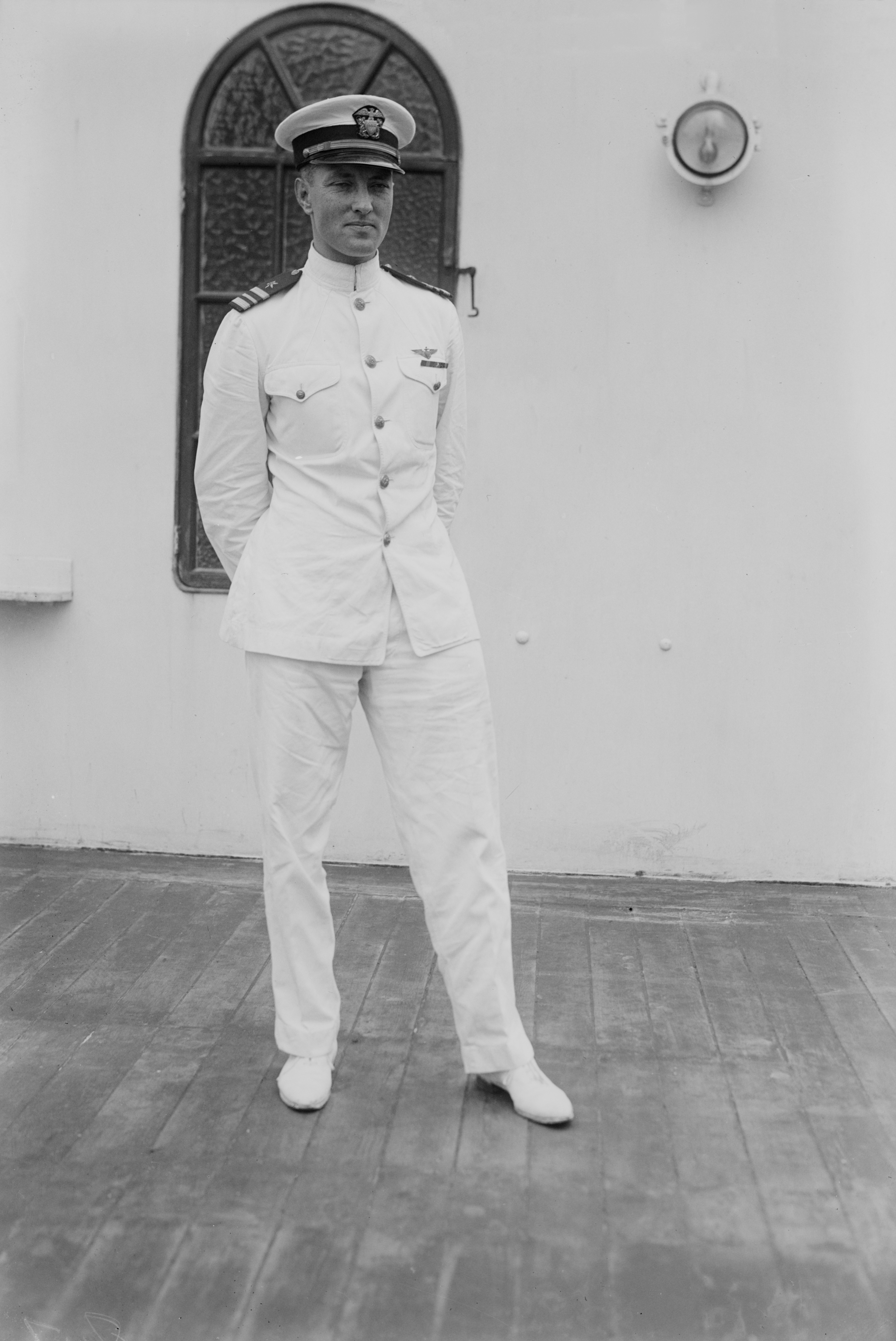
Richard Byrd

== See also ==
- List of Medal of Honor recipients
- Medal of Honor Memorial – Memorial in Indianapolis, Indiana, US
- United States Naval Academy Cemetery § Medal of Honor recipients
