= Henry Lakin Simpson =

English-American sailor (1859–1881)

- Born: 1859; London, England
- Died: April 3, 1881 (aged 21–22); Thomasville, Georgia, U.S.
- Burial place: Mt. Zion Cemetery, Collingdale, Pennsylvania
- Military career
- Allegiance: United States
- Branch: United States Navy
- Rank: Cadet-Engineer
- Unit: USS Essex
- Awards: Medal of Honor

Henry Lakin Simpson (1859 – April 3, 1881) was a United States Navy sailor and a recipient of the United States military's highest decoration, the Medal of Honor. He later attended the United States Naval Academy.

Born in London, England, in 1859, Simpson emigrated to the United States and joined the Navy from New York. By October 31, 1877, he was serving as a first class fireman on the USS Essex, which was at Monrovia, Liberia. On that day, he and another sailor, Ordinary Seaman John Millmore, rescued their shipmate Ordinary Seaman John W. Powers from drowning. For this action, both Simpson and Millmore were awarded the Medal of Honor seven years later, on October 18, 1884. Simpson's award was posthumous.

Simpson was accepted into the United States Naval Academy as an engineering student (then known as cadet-engineers). He was admitted to the class of 1882, but resigned his appointment on February 28, 1881, before graduating.

On Apr. 3, 1881 at age 21 Simpson died of consumption on board the City of Savannah (a steam ship) and was buried at the Delaware County Society of the New Jerusalem Church Burial Ground in Upper Darby, Pennsylvania. In the 1970s all remains were removed and reinterred in a mass grave at Mt Zion Cemetery in Collingdale, Pennsylvania.

== Medal of Honor citation ==
Simpson's official Medal of Honor citation reads:

For rescuing from drowning John W. Powers, ordinary seaman on board the U.S.S. Essex, at Monrovia, Liberia, 31 October 1877.

== See also ==
- List of Medal of Honor recipients during peacetime
- List of United States Naval Academy alumni (Medal of Honor)
