= Hugh Carroll Frazer =

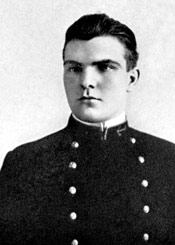
- Hugh C. Frazer
- Born: February 22, 1891; Martinsburg, West Virginia, US
- Died: July 9, 1975 (aged 84); Washington, D.C., US
- Burial place: Arlington National Cemetery
- Military career
- Allegiance: United States of America
- Branch: United States Navy
- Service years: 1912 - 1932, 1942
- Rank: Commander
- Awards: Medal of Honor

Hugh Carroll Frazer (February 22, 1891 – July 9, 1975) was born in the Martinsburg, West Virginia. He graduated from the United States Naval Academy in 1912. He received the Medal of Honor for actions at the United States occupation of Veracruz, 1914. Frazer was also a veteran of World War I and World War II.

== Medal of Honor citation ==
Rank and organization: Ensign
Organization: U.S. Navy
Born:Martinsburg, W. Va.
Entered service at: West Virginia
Place/Date: Vera Cruz, Mexico, 22 April 1914
Date of issue: 12/04/1915

Citation:

For extraordinary heroism in battle, engagement of Vera Cruz, 22 April 1914. During this engagement, Ens. Frazer ran forward to rescue a wounded man, exposing himself to hostile fire and that of his own men. Having accomplished the mission, he returned at once to his position in line.

== See also ==
- List of Medal of Honor recipients (Veracruz)
- List of United States Naval Academy alumni (Medal of Honor)
