= John Millmore =

- Born: 26 March 1859; New York City, U.S.
- Died: Unknown
- Military career
- Allegiance: United States
- Branch: United States Navy
- Service years: 1876 - 1880
- Rank: Ordinary Seaman
- Unit: USS Essex
- Awards: Medal of Honor

John Millmore (26 March 1859 – ?) was a United States Navy sailor and a recipient of the United States military's highest decoration, the Medal of Honor.

Born on 26 March 1859 in New York, New York, Millmore joined the Navy from that state in January 1876. By October 31, 1877, he was serving as an ordinary seaman on the USS Essex, which was at Monrovia, Liberia. On that day, he and another sailor, First Class Fireman Henry Lakin Simpson, rescued their shipmate Ordinary Seaman John W. Powers from drowning. For this action, both Millmore and Simpson were awarded the Medal of Honor seven years later, on October 18, 1884.

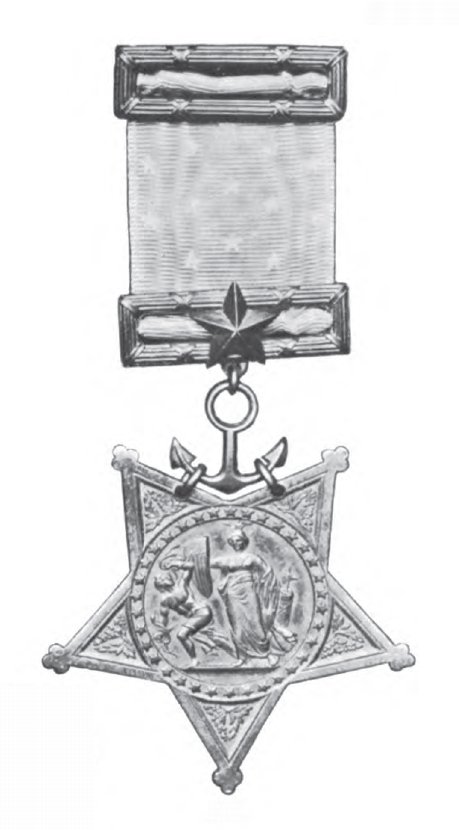
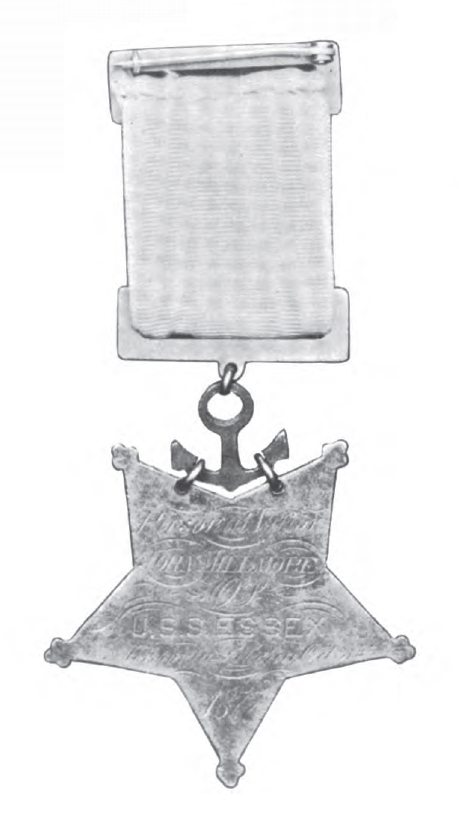
Millmore's Medal of Honor, front and back

Millmore's official Medal of Honor citation reads:

Serving on board the U.S.S. Essex, Millmore rescued from drowning John W. Powers, ordinary seaman, serving on the same vessel with him, at Monrovia, Liberia, 31 October 1877.

Millmore's medal is held by the American Numismatic Society.

== See also ==
- List of Medal of Honor recipients during peacetime
