= Rufus Zenas Johnston =

U.S. Navy Medal of Honor recipient

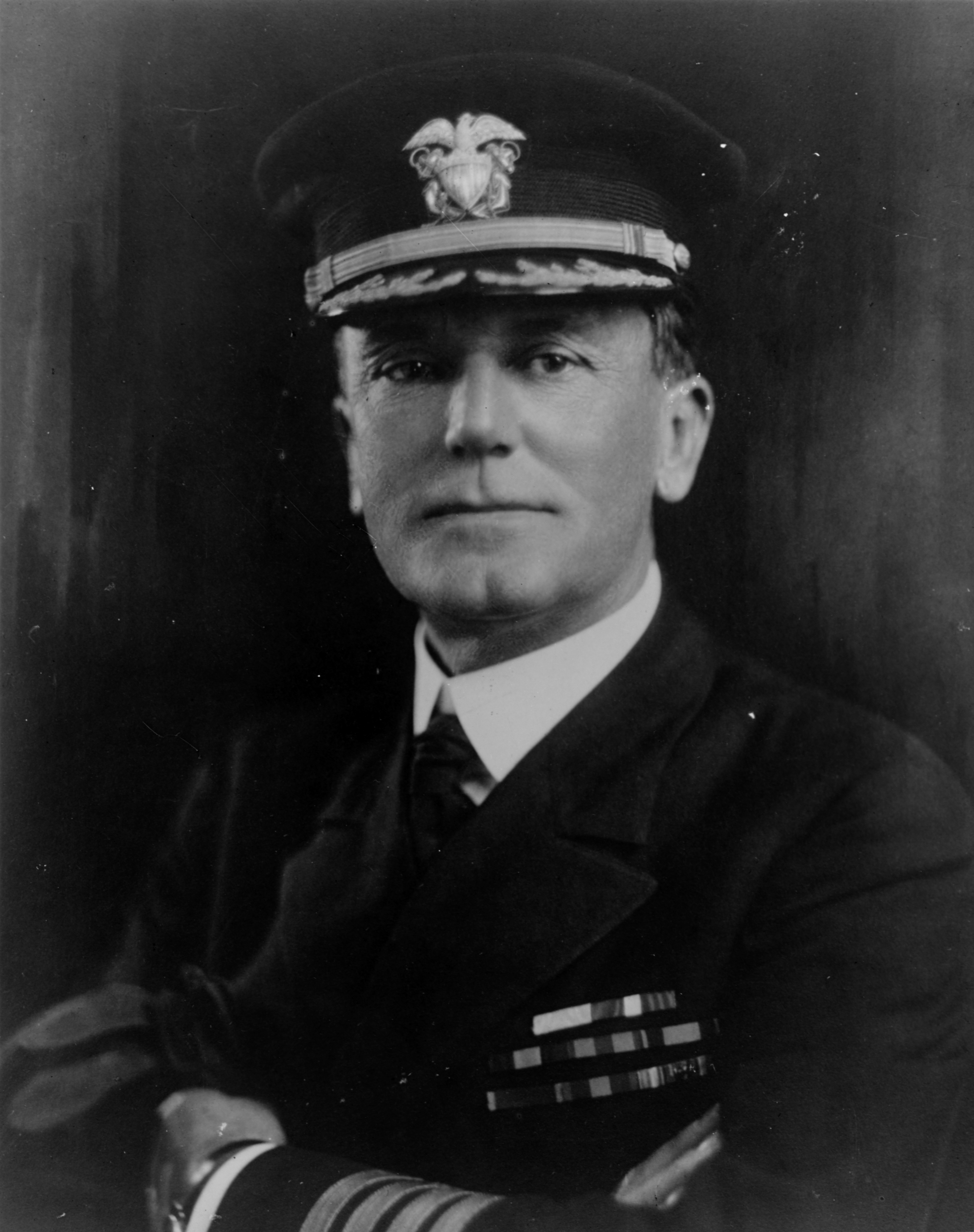
- Johnston as a captain ca. 1929
- Born: June 7, 1874; Lincolnton, North Carolina, US
- Died: July 4, 1959 (aged 85); Newport, Rhode Island, US
- Burial place: Arlington National Cemetery
- Military career
- Allegiance: United States
- Branch: United States Navy
- Service years: 1895–1930
- Rank: Rear Admiral (retired list)
- Commands: USS Utah (BB-31); Naval Training Station, Hampton Roads; USS Michigan (BB-27); USS Frederick (ACR-8); USS Minneapolis (C-13); Naval Training Station, Newport; USS Dolphin; USS Biddle (TB-26)
- Conflicts: Spanish–American War; Philippine Insurrection; China Relief Expedition; United States occupation of Veracruz; World War I
- Awards: Medal of Honor; Navy Cross

Rufus Zenas Johnston (June 7, 1874 – July 4, 1959) was born in Lincolnton, North Carolina. He graduated from the United States Naval Academy in 1895. He received the Medal of Honor for actions at the United States occupation of Veracruz in 1914. Johnston is also a recipient of the Navy Cross and served in the Battle of Santiago de Cuba, Philippine–American War, Boxer Rebellion and World War I.

== Biography ==
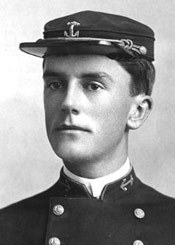
Johnston as a U.S. Naval Academy midshipman

After graduation from the Naval Academy in June 1895, Johnston served aboard the protected cruiser Philadelphia for two years. Promoted from midshipman to ensign in June 1897, he then served aboard the battleship Oregon. His ship participated in the Spanish–American War, the Philippine Insurrection and the China Relief Expedition during the Boxer Rebellion.

Transferred to the crew of the hospital ship Solace, Johnston returned to the United States where he served aboard the battleship Kearsarge. Promoted to lieutenant junior grade in July 1900, he briefly served aboard the battleship Indiana before joining the staff back at the Naval Academy. In May 1902, Johnston was given command of the torpedo boat Biddle. He was promoted to lieutenant in January 1903.

In June 1905, Johnston was assigned to the Bureau of Navigation in Washington, D.C., where he served for two years before joining the crew of the dispatch vessel Dolphin. He was promoted to lieutenant commander in July 1908 and made executive officer in January 1909. Johnston briefly served as commanding officer before being reassigned to Naval Training Station, Newport in April 1910 as executive officer of the training ship Constellation.

In November 1912, Johnston was assigned to the battleship New Hampshire. In April 1914, he went ashore at Veracruz to help seize control of the Mexican port city. In July 1914, Johnston was promoted to commander and became executive officer. In October 1915, he became commandant of Naval Training Station, Newport.

During World War I, Johnston was frocked as a captain in October 1917. His temporary promotion was approved on January 1, 1918, and he assumed command of the protected cruiser Minneapolis later that month. In September 1918, Johnston briefly served as commanding officer of the armored cruiser Frederick before being injured. He was sent to Naval Hospital, Newport to recuperate. After recovering, Johnston attended the Naval War College in 1919. On June 6, 1920, his promotion to captain was made permanent.

In October 1920, Johnston briefly served as commanding officer of the battleship Michigan before becoming commandant of the Receiving Station and Naval Training Station at Hampton Roads, Virginia. In December 1922, he assumed command of the battleship Utah. From November 1924 to March 1925, his ship carried Lt. Gen. John J. Pershing on a good will tour of South America. In April 1925, Johnston relinquished command to Capt. Walton R. Sexton and reported to the Bureau of Navigation in May.

From 1925 to 1927, Johnston served as chief of staff at the Naval War College. In July 1927, he became chief of staff to the commander of the Scouting Fleet, serving aboard the battleship Arkansas and then the battleship Wyoming. From August 1928 to June 1930, Johnston served as assistant commandant of the First Naval District in Boston, Massachusetts.

Johnston retired from active duty as a captain on June 30, 1930. He was later advanced to rear admiral on the retired list as the result of an act of Congress passed on August 7, 1947.

After retirement, Johnston lived in Newport, Rhode Island. He died at his home there on July 4, 1959. Johnston is buried at Arlington National Cemetery.

== Medal of Honor citation ==
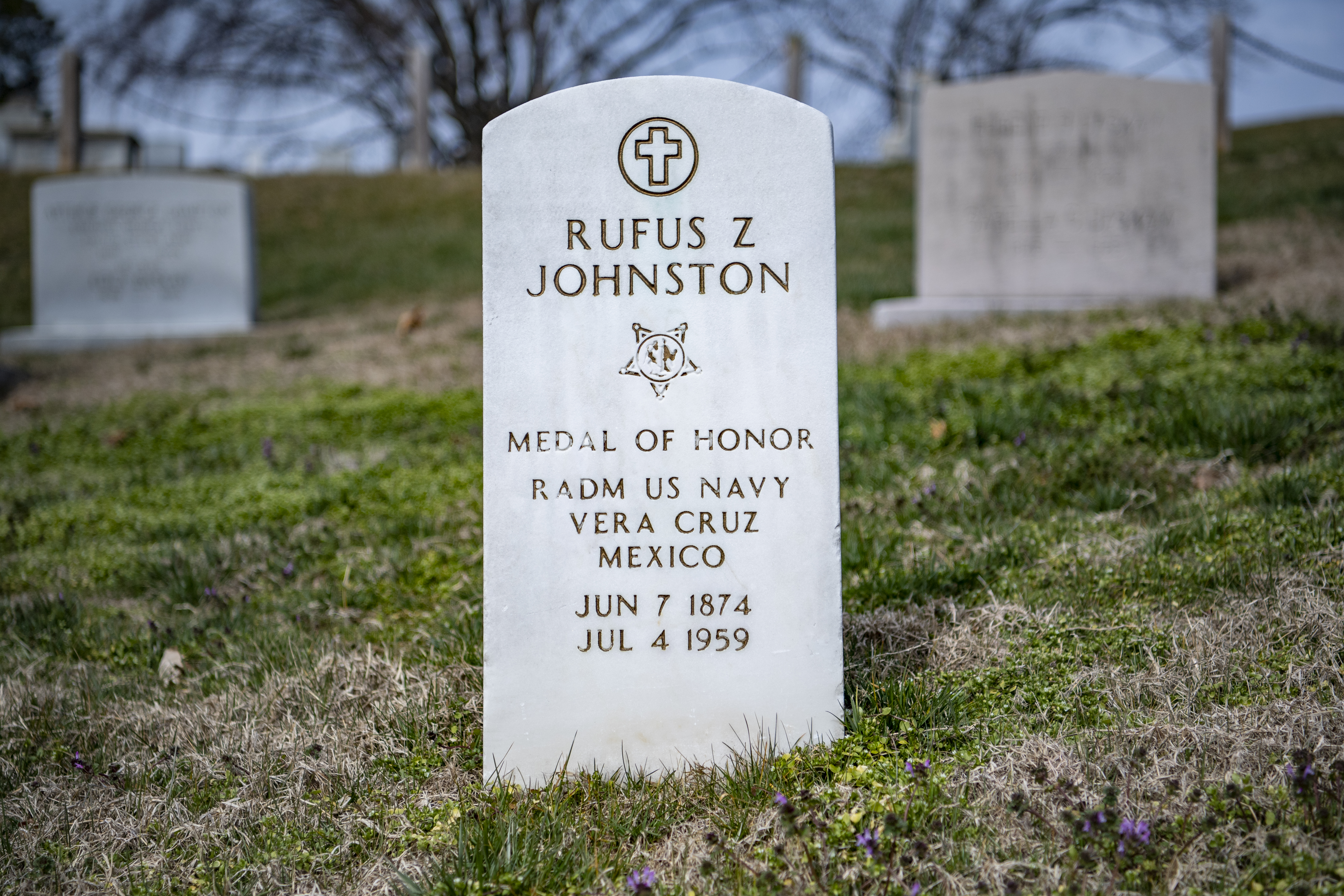
Grave at Arlington National Cemetery

Rank and organization: Lieutenant Commander Organization: U.S. Navy Born: 7 June 1874, Lincolnton, N.C. Accredited to: North Carolina Date of Issue: 12/04/1915

Johnston was awarded the Medal of Honor citation

For distinguished conduct in battle, engagement of Vera Cruz, 22 April 1914; was regimental adjutant, and eminent and conspicuous in his conduct. He exhibited courage and skill in leading his men through the action of the 22d and in the final occupation of the city.

== Navy Cross citation ==
On September 23, 1919, Captain Johnston was awarded the Navy Cross citation

For distinguished service in the line of his profession as commanding officer of the U. S. S. Minneapolis, engaged in the important, exacting and hazardous duty of transporting and escorting troops and supplies to European ports through waters infested with enemy submarines and mines.

== Family ==
Johnston was the son of Robert Zenas, who was a Presbyterian minister, and Catherine Caldwell Johnston.

On June 2, 1903, Johnston married Emma "Emcie" Pegram (August 8, 1877 – December 25, 1951) in Richmond, Virginia. The couple had three children: Rufus Zenas Jr., Elizabeth, and Catherine.

== See also ==
- List of Medal of Honor recipients (Veracruz)
- List of United States Naval Academy alumni (Medal of Honor)
