= Richard DeCharms =

American clergyman (1796–1864)

Richard DeCharms (October 17, 1796 – March 20, 1864) was an American minister.

He was the son of William and Sarah (Mead) DeCharms, and was born in Philadelphia, October 17, 1796. His father, a native of Hammersmith near London, came to this country in 1793, and became a noted practitioner of medicine in Philadelphia. His mother kept a boarding house in Philadelphia which was the favorite resort of the members of the early United States Congress assembled in that city. The DeCharms family, (Des Champs,) is of Norman origin; the Huguenot ancestors of the American branch having fled from Caen to London in 1685, on the Revocation of the Edict of Nantes.

In early life Richard DeCharms was a practical printer. His final preparation for College was made under the direction of Rev. John Langdon, at Bethlehem, Connecticut. He graduated from Yale College in 1826. During the year subsequent to his graduation, he resided in Boston engaged in the study of Swedenborgian theology, under Rev. Thos Worcester D. D., at the same time superintending the publication of the New Jerusalem Magazine, the first three numbers of which he printed with his own hands. His theological studies were continued in Baltimore with Rev. John Hargrove, and his first sermon on the Paramount Importance of Spiritual Things, was published at that place in 1828, and was afterwards reprinted in London. After a year of pastoral labor in Bedford, Pennsylvania, DeCharms went to London and made further studies in Theology under Rev. Samuel Noble. On returning to this country in 1832, he became Pastor of the First New Jerusalem Church in Cincinnati, and conducted a periodical called The Precursor. In 1839 he became Minister of the New Jerusalem Church in Philadelphia, in which post he remained five years. Between 1845 and 1850 he was settled in Baltimore, after which he returned to Philadelphia. He subsequently preached for a little while in New York, though Philadelphia continued to be his home.

In his later days he devoted much attention to various mechanical contrivances and inventions of his own. He published a large number of sermons and other treatises chiefly in the defense of Swedenborgian Theology, among the more important of which were the following : Sermons illustrating the Doctrine of the Lord, (1840); Series of Lectures delivered at Charleston, South Carolina, (1841); The New Churchman, a periodical, and The New Churchman—Extra, Freedom and Slavery in the Light of the New Jerusalem; Portions of a series of Sermons against Spiritualism.

The mind of DeCharms was impaired in early life, but not so seriously as to deter him from active intellectual employments. brought on about In 1847 he is reported to have suffered various disorders including congestion of the brain, attributed to his severe labor, from which he never recovered. He died in Philadelphia, March 20, 1864, aged 67 years 5 months.

In 1833, he married Miss Mary Graham, daughter of Major George Graham of Stoystown, Penn. They became the parents of eight children, four boys and four girls.
