= Harry C. Beasley =

- Born: November 1, 1889; Newark, Ohio, US
- Died: July 2, 1931 (aged 41); Newark, Ohio, US
- Burial place: Cedar Hill Cemetery, Newark, Ohio
- Military career
- Allegiance: United States
- Branch: United States Navy
- Service years: 1908–1921
- Rank: Chief Petty Officer
- Unit: USS Florida (BB-30)
- Conflicts: United States occupation of Veracruz, 1914
- Awards: Medal of Honor, Good Conduct Medal, World War I Victory Medal, Mexican Service Medal, Navy Expeditionary Medal
- Other work: Police Officer

Harry C. Beasley (November 1, 1889 – July 2, 1931) was a United States Navy seaman who received the Medal of Honor for actions during the United States occupation of Veracruz, 1914. He also served as a police officer in Newark, Ohio, where he was killed in the line of duty by unknown gunmen in 1931.

== Life ==
Beasley was born in 1889 in Newark, Ohio. After joining the United States Navy, Beasley served as a seaman on board the USS Florida.

Shortly after being awarded the Medal of Honor in 1914 for actions during the United States occupation of Veracruz, Beasley left the Navy. However, he re-enlisted during World War I and served until 1921, eventually reaching the rank of Chief Petty Officer.

== Service during United States occupation of Veracruz ==
In 1914, Beasley took part in the United States occupation of Veracruz, 1914, serving as an armed Navy sailor (known as "Bluejackets") tasked with capturing the city's Customs House. Led by Ensign George M. Lowry, Beasley's company was pinned down by "murderous rifle and machine-gun fire." Not wanting to risk his entire company, Lowry asked for volunteers to approach the Customs House from the side. Five men volunteered: Beasley, Joseph G. Harner, Coxswain J. F. Schumaker, Boatswain's Mate Second Class George Cregan, and Seaman Lawrence C. Sinnett.

Lowry led the volunteers into a narrow alley, where they came under a cross fire from riflemen in the Customs Building and machine gunners in a nearby hotel. During this fighting, "A bullet clipped one of the buttons off Lowry's cap and another tore through his right legging, creasing the flesh. Beasley was slightly wounded, and Schumaker was shot through the head."

After his men were able to silence the machine gunners with return rifle fire, Lowry called for a corpsman to help Schumaker. Hospital Apprentice First Class William Zuiderveld ran down the alley and tried to stop the flow of blood from Schumaker's head, but was unable to do so. Schumaker soon died.

Once Zuiderveld carried Schumaker to the rear, Lowry and his surviving men worked their way up the alley and scaled the wall around the Customs House. After Lowry and his men smashed through a window, the people inside surrendered. Several days later, Lowry returned to the scene and counted twelve bullet impacts on the wall where his men had climbed it.

Beasley, along with almost all of the men who volunteered for the attack, received the Medal of Honor for his actions.

== Later life and death ==
After the war Beasley returned to his hometown of Newark and, in 1924, became a police officer with the city's police department. During the evening of June 30, 1931, Beasley was walking a downtown beat when "he was gunned down by an armed gang attempting the theft of a safe from a local shoe store." He died two days later from multiple gunshot wounds; his killers were never identified or caught.

Beasley's Medal of Honor and other military awards are on display in the lobby of the Newark Police Department, having been donated by his surviving relatives.

== Medal of Honor citation ==
Rank and organization: Seaman, U.S. Navy. Born: November 1, 1888 Ohio. Accredited to: Ohio. G.O. No.: 101, June 15, 1914.

Citation:

On board the U.S.S. Florida for extraordinary heroism in the line of his profession during the seizure of Vera Cruz, Mexico, April 21, 1914.

== See also ==
- List of Medal of Honor recipients (Veracruz)
- List of unsolved murders (1900–1979)
