= William Zuiderveld =

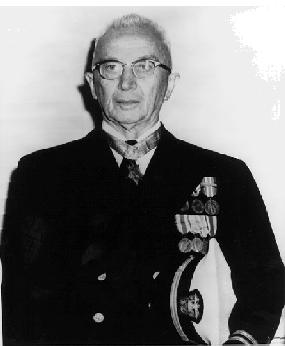
- William Zuiderveld, Medal of Honor recipient
- Born: January 8, 1888; Tallmadge Township, Michigan, US
- Died: February 5, 1978 (aged 90); Oceanside, California, US
- Burial place: Fort Rosecrans National Cemetery San Diego, California
- Military career
- Allegiance: United States
- Branch: United States Navy
- Rank: Lieutenant
- Unit: USS Florida
- Conflicts: US occupation of Veracruz; World War II
- Awards: Medal of Honor

William Zuiderveld (January 8, 1888 – February 5, 1978) was a United States Navy Hospital Apprentice First Class. He received the Medal of Honor for actions during the United States occupation of Veracruz.

== Service during United States occupation of Veracruz ==
In 1914, Zuiderveld took part in the United States occupation of Veracruz, serving as a hospital corpsman with a company of armed sailors (known as "Bluejackets") who were tasked with capturing the city's Customs House.

The company, led by Ensign George M. Lowry, became pinned down by "murderous rifle and machine-gun fire" as they approached the Customs house. Not wanting to risk his entire company, Lowry asked for volunteers to approach the Customs House from the side. Five men volunteered: Joseph G. Harner, Coxswain J. F. Schumaker, Boatswain's Mate Second Class George Cregan, and Seamen Harry C. Beasley and Lawrence C. Sinnett.

Lowry lead the volunteers into a narrow alley, where they came under crossfire from riflemen in the Customs Building and machine gunners in a nearby hotel. During this fighting, "A bullet clipped one of the buttons off Lowry's cap and another tore through his right legging, creasing the flesh. Beasley was slightly wounded, and Schumaker was shot through the head."

After his men were able to silence the machine gunners with return rifle fire, Lowry called for a corpsman to help Schumaker. Zuiderveld ran down the alley while under fire and tried to stop the flow of blood from Schumaker's head.

Once Zuiderveld carried Schumaker – who would soon die – to the rear, Lowry and his surviving men worked their way up the alley and scaled the wall around the Customs House. Several days later, Lowry returned to the scene and counted twelve bullet impacts on the wall where his men had climbed it. After Lowry and his men smashed through a window of the Customs House, the personnel inside surrendered.

Zuiderveld, along with almost all of the men who volunteered for the attack, received the Medal of Honor for their actions.

He rose to the rank of lieutenant before retiring from the Navy.

He was buried Fort Rosecrans National Cemetery San Diego, California. His grave can be found in section A-I, Grave 9b, at 32.41359°N 117.14716°W.

== Medal of Honor citation ==
Rank and organization: Hospital Apprentice First Class, U.S. Navy. Place and date: Vera Cruz, Mexico, April 21, 1914. Entered service at: Michigan. Birth: Michigan. G.O. No.: 116, August 9, 1914.

Citation:

On board the USS Florida, Zuiderveld showed extraordinary heroism in the line of his profession during the seizure of Vera Cruz, Mexico, 21 April 1914.

== See also ==
- List of Medal of Honor recipients (Veracruz)
