= General Reid =

General Reid may refer to:

- Charles Reid (Indian Army officer) (1818–1901), British East India Company general
- Denys Whitehorn Reid (1897–1970), British Indian Army major general
- George Reid (soldier) (1733–1815), New Hampshire Militia brigadier general
- George Croghan Reid (1876–1961), U.S. Marine Corps brigadier general
- John Reid (British Army officer) (1721–1807), British Army general
- William Reid (British Army officer) (1791–1858), Corps of Royal Engineers Board of Ordnance major general

== See also ==
- Attorney General Reid (disambiguation)
- General Read (disambiguation)
- General Reed (disambiguation)
