= George M. Lowry =

United States Navy officer (1889–1981)

George Maus Lowry
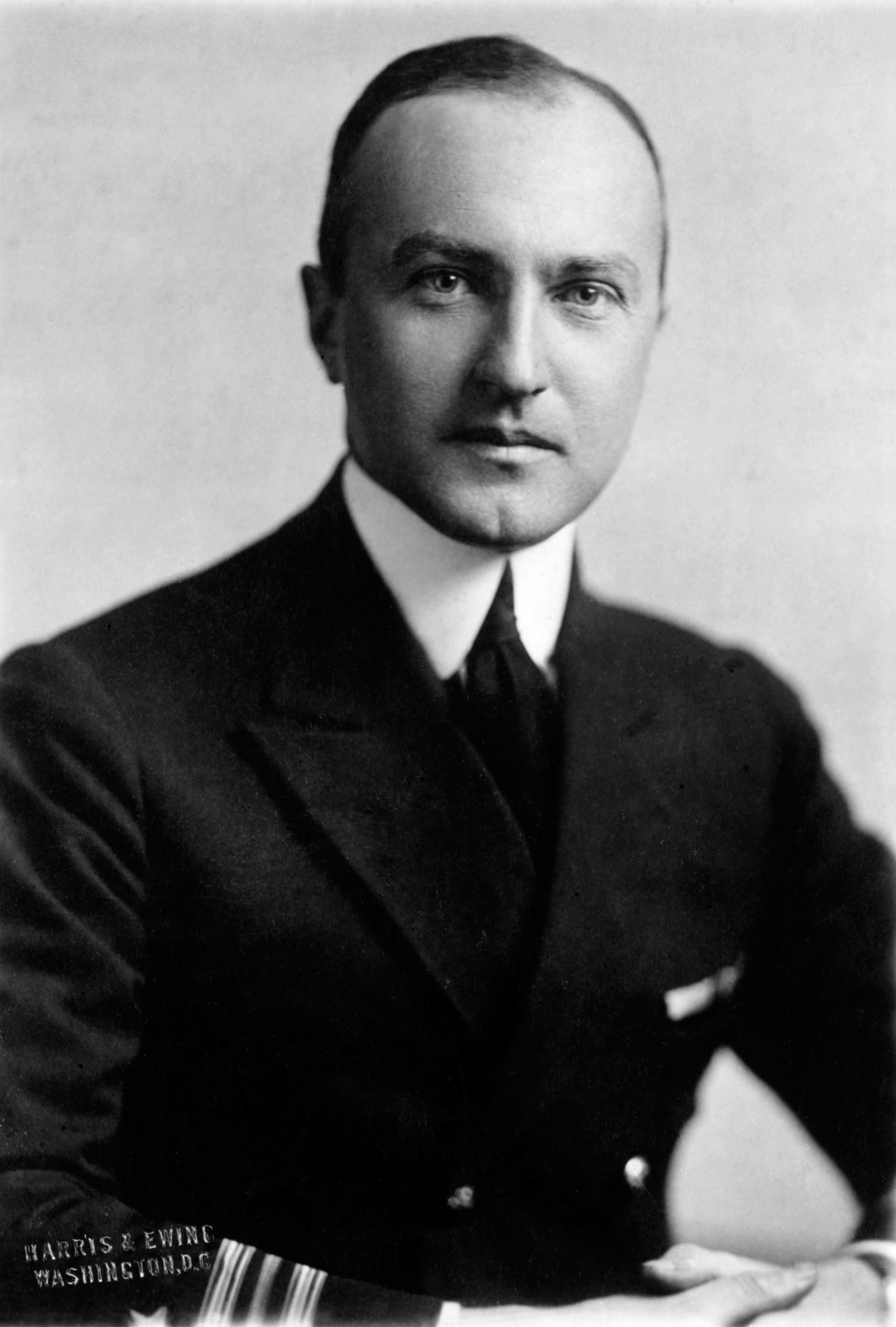
- George M. Lowry, Medal of Honor recipient
- Born: October 27, 1889; Erie, Pennsylvania, US
- Died: September 25, 1981 (aged 91); Carmel-by-the-Sea, California, US
- Burial place: Buried at sea
- Military career
- Allegiance: United States of America
- Branch: United States Navy
- Service years: 1911–1927, 1940–1946
- Rank: Rear Admiral
- Conflicts: Veracruz Expedition; World War I World War II
- Awards: Medal of Honor; Legion of Merit

George Maus Lowry (October 27, 1889 – September 25, 1981) served as a rear admiral in the United States Navy. He received the Medal of Honor for actions during the United States occupation of Veracruz, 1914. When he died in 1981 he was the last surviving Medal of Honor recipient of the occupation.

== Life ==
Lowry was born in Erie, Pennsylvania on October 27, 1889, the son of Ricardo St. Phillip Lowry. After appointment to the United States Naval Academy, Lowry graduated on June 2, 1911.

In 1913, he commanded the USS Niagara (1813) on a tour of the Great Lakes after the sunken ship was raised and reconstructed.

He was married to Caroline Coleman, who died in 1979.

== Service during United States occupation of Veracruz ==
In 1914, Ensign Lowry took part in the United States occupation of Veracruz, where he led the First Company of armed Navy sailors (known as "Bluejackets") from the USS Florida (BB-30). Tasked with capturing the city's Customs House, Lowry's company became pinned down by "murderous rifle and machine-gun fire." Deciding not to risk his entire company in a frontal attack, Lowry instead asked for volunteers to approach the Customs House from the side. Five men volunteered: Joseph Gabriel Harner, Coxswain J. F. Schumaker, Boatswain's Mate Second Class George Cregan, and Seamen Harry C. Beasley and Lawrence C. Sinnett.

Lowry led the volunteers into a narrow alley, where they came under a crossfire from riflemen in the Customs Building and machine gunners in a nearby hotel. During this fighting, "A bullet clipped one of the buttons off Lowry's cap and another tore through his right legging, creasing the flesh. Beasley was slightly wounded, and Schumaker was shot through the head."

After his men were able to silence the machine gunners with return rifle fire, Lowry called for a corpsman to help Schumaker. Hospital Apprentice First Class William Zuiderveld ran down the alley and tried to stop the flow of blood from Schumaker's head, but was unable to do so. Schumaker soon died.

Once Zuiderveld carried Schumaker to the rear, Lowry and his surviving men worked their way up the alley and scaled the wall around the Custom's House. After Lowry and his men smashed through a window of the Customs House, the personnel inside surrendered.

Several days later, Lowry returned to the scene and counted twelve bullet impacts on the wall where his men had climbed it.

Lowry, along with almost all of the men who volunteered for the attack, received the Medal of Honor for his actions.

== Medal of Honor citation ==
Rank and organization: Ensign, U.S. Navy. Place and date: Vera Cruz, Mexico, 21-April 22, 1914. Entered service at: Pennsylvania. Birth: Erie, Pa. G.O. No.: 177, December 4, 1915.

Citation:

For distinguished conduct in battle, engagements of Vera Cruz, 21–22 April 1914; Ens. Lowry was in both days' fighting at the head of his company, and was eminent and conspicuous in his conduct, leading his men with skill and courage.

== Later career ==
During Lowry's later career, he commanded the USS Coghlan (DD-326), USS O'Bannon (DD-177) and USS Macdonough (DD-331). Prior to entering the Naval Reserve in 1927, he also served in the Bureau of Navigation.

In 1940 Lowry was recalled to the active service in the Navy as captain and served as assistant operations officer in the 12th Naval District. After the Japanese attack on Pearl Harbor, Lowry was transferred to the staff of the Commander Western Sea Frontier first under the command of Rear Admiral David W. Bagley and then under Admiral Royal E. Ingersoll. In this capacity, Lowry was appointed an operations officer and as convoy and routing officer of the Western Sea Frontier."

For his service in this capacity, Lowry was decorated with the Legion of Merit. Lowry was relieved of all active duties in September 1946 and subsequently retired one month later. He was advanced to the rank of rear admiral on the retired list due to having been specially commended in combat.

== Decorations ==
Here is the ribbon bar of Rear Admiral George M. Lowry:

1st Row	Medal of Honor		Legion of Merit
2nd Row	Mexican Service Medal	World War I Victory Medal with Destroyer Clasp	American Defense Service Medal
3rd Row	American Campaign Medal	World War II Victory Medal	Mexican Order of Naval Merit, 1st Class

== Later life ==
After the war, Lowry wrote several articles which were printed in the United States Naval Institute magazine Proceedings, including "Exploits of the U-53," "The Clipperton Operations" and "L-16: Mystery No Longer." After his death in 1981, he was buried at sea per his previous request. There is currently a professorship in his honor at the Naval War College in Newport, Rhode Island.

== See also ==
- List of Medal of Honor recipients (Veracruz)
