= Paul Frederick Foster =

US Navy admiral and Medal of Honor recipient (1889–1972)

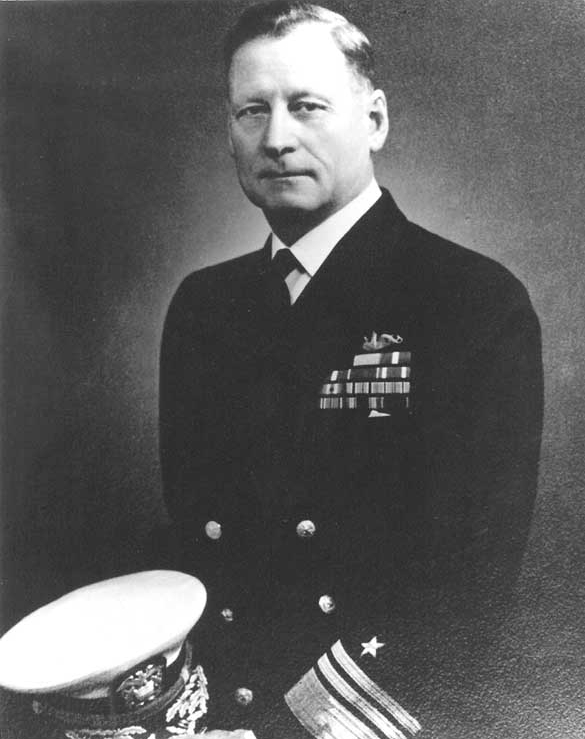
- Vice Admiral Paul Foster in the 1950s
- Born: March 25, 1889; Wichita, Kansas, US
- Died: January 30, 1972 (aged 82); Virginia Beach, Virginia, US
- Burial place: Arlington National Cemetery (Section 5, site 106)
- Military career
- Allegiance: United States of America
- Branch: United States Navy
- Service years: 1911–1929, 1941–1946
- Rank: Vice admiral
- Commands: USS L-2; USS G-4
- Conflicts: Mexican Revolution; Battle of Veracruz; World War I; World War II
- Awards: Medal of Honor; Navy Cross; Distinguished Service Medal; Legion of Merit; Navy Commendation Medal
- Other work: International Atomic Energy Agency

Paul Frederick Foster (March 25, 1889 – January 30, 1972) was a highly decorated officer in the United States Navy with the rank of vice admiral. A graduate of the Naval Academy at Annapolis, he distinguished himself during the Battle of Veracruz in April 1914 and received Medal of Honor, the United States of America's highest and most-prestigious personal military decoration.

During World War I, Foster commanded the submarine L-2 and is credited with the sinking of the German submarine SM UB-65 in July 1918, for which he received Navy Distinguished Service Medal. He remained in the Navy following the war and received the Navy Cross for valor during the explosion of turret gun of light cruiser Trenton in October 1924. Foster resigned from active duty in 1929, but was recalled to active service during World War II, serving as Assistant Inspector General of the Navy until 1946.

Foster then served as General Manager for International Activities, Atomic Energy Commission, until February 1959, when he was appointed by President Dwight D. Eisenhower as a Permanent U.S. Representative to the International Atomic Energy Agency in Vienna, Austria.

== Early career ==
Paul F. Foster was born on March 25, 1889, in Wichita, Kansas, the son of Congregational minister Festus Foster and Lillian C. Howe. Due to his father's work with the Congregationalists, he spent his childhood successively in Kansas, Utah, Oklahoma, and Idaho. Foster graduated from high school and entered the University of Idaho in Moscow, Idaho, where he spent one year before received an appointment to the United States Naval Academy at Annapolis, Maryland, nominated by Senator Fred Dubois of Idaho in summer 1907.

While at the Academy, Foster was active as business manager of the Lucky Bag, a Naval Academy yearbook dedicated to the graduating classes and reached the rank of cadet-commander. While in this rank, he served as commander of the Midshipmen Battalion.

Among his classmates were several future distinguished flag officers, including four-star admirals Oscar C. Badger, John W. Reeves Jr.; vice admirals Bernhard H. Bieri, Calvin H. Cobb, Morton Deyo, Robert M. Griffin, Edward Hanson, Howard F. Kingman, Frank J. Lowry, Oliver M. Read; rear admirals Daniel J. Callaghan, Theodore E. Chandler, Robert H. English, George M. Lowry, and Harry L. Merring.

He graduated as Passed Midshipman with Bachelor of Science degree in June 1911 and was attached to the armored cruiser Washington, operating in the Caribbean. Foster served aboard Washington until December that year, when he was transferred to the newly commissioned battleship Utah, under Captain William S. Benson. He took part in the patrol cruises with the Atlantic Fleet and was commissioned an ensign on July 10, 1911.

In early 1914 during the Mexican Revolution, the United States decided to intervene in the fighting. While en route to Mexico on April 16, Utah was ordered to intercept the German-flagged steamer SS Ypiranga, which was carrying arms to the Mexican dictator Victoriano Huerta. Ypiranga's arrival in Veracruz prompted the United States to occupy the city. Foster at the head of his company led his sailors ashore during the fighting April 21–22, 1914. For distinguished conduct in battle, he was decorated with the Medal of Honor, the United States' highest and most-prestigious decoration.

== World War I ==
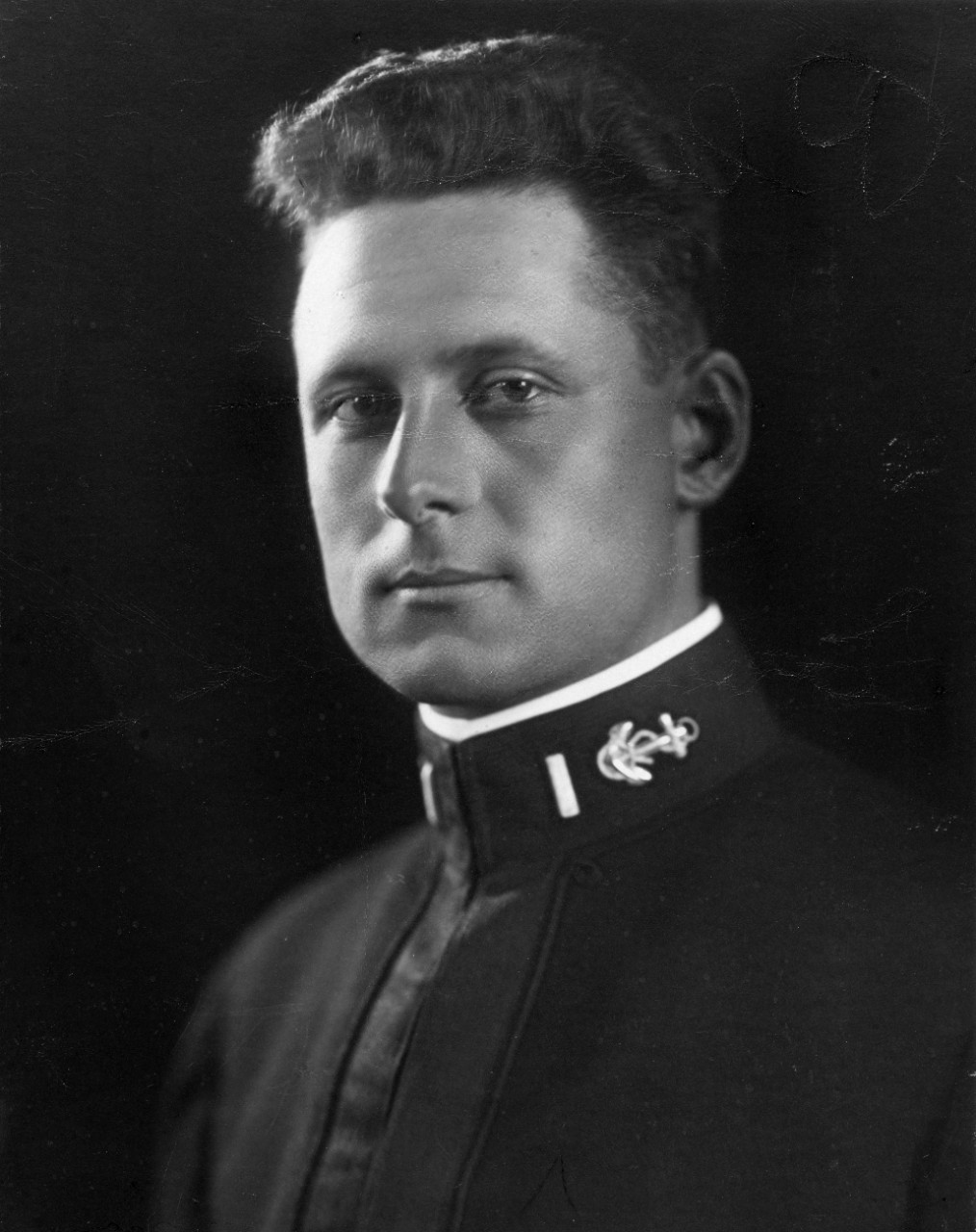
Foster as an ensign in 1914

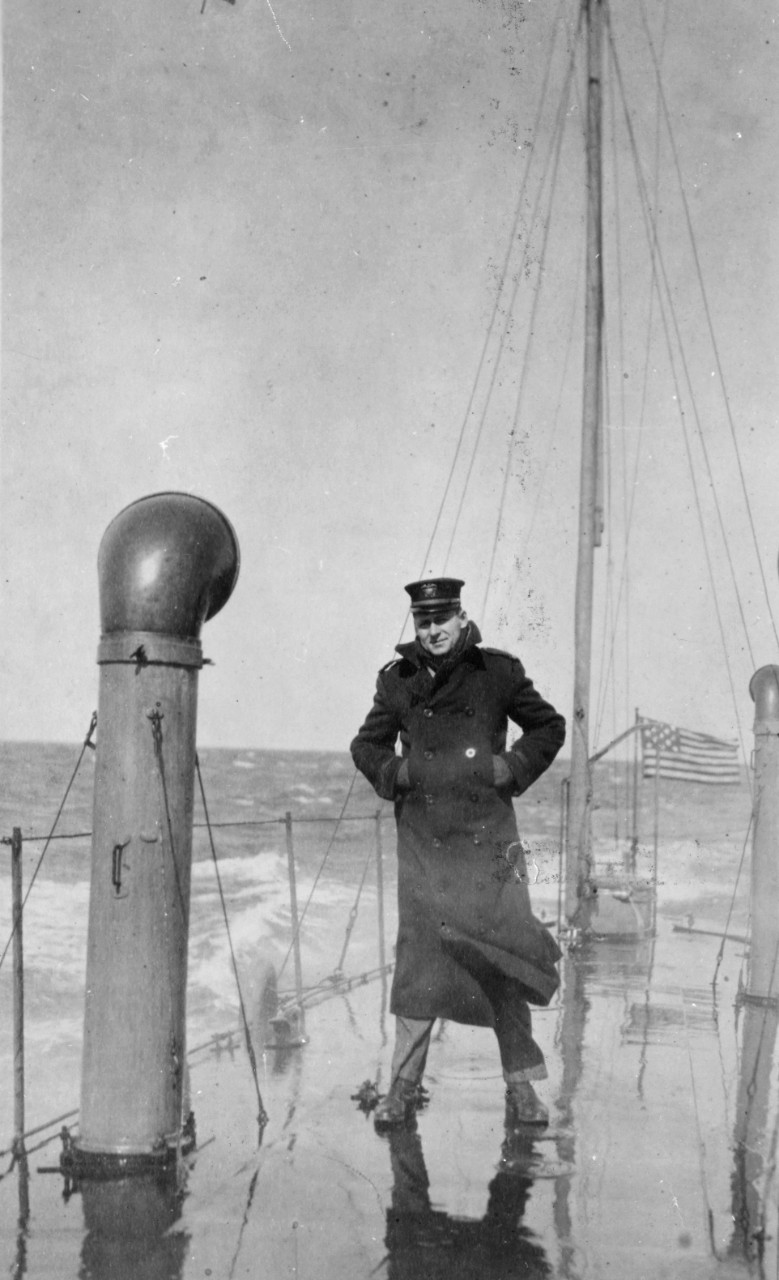
Foster aboard submarine G-4 in 1915

Following his return to the United States in November 1914, Foster was ordered to the Naval Submarine Base New London, Connecticut, for submarine instruction. He completed the instruction in early 1915 and was attached to the submarine G-4, the experimental vessel of Italian design under command of Lieutenant Ernest D. McWhorter. Foster served as his executive officer and participated in maneuvers with the submarine flotilla off Newport, Rhode Island, and was promoted to lieutenant (junior grade) on March 7, 1915.

Foster relieved McWhorter as commanding officer of the submarine in February 1916 and led her during the maneuvers with Atlantic Fleet off Nantucket and Martha's Vineyard. He also transported Elmer A. Sperry to try out his gyroscopic ship stabilizer, but when the United States entered World War I in April 1917, Foster travelled to Washington, D.C., where he approached his former commanding officer from Utah, now Chief of Naval Operations, Admiral William S. Benson, and requested to be assigned to the war zone in Europe. But Benson declined to interfere in personnel matters and turned down Foster's request.

He subsequently return to command of the submarine G-4 and conducted further experiments with professors from Cornell University. During his return from one experiment, Foster docked his submarine so skillfully, that he impressed Captain Thomas C. Hart, chief of staff to the commander, Submarine Force, Atlantic Fleet, and he requested Foster to be assigned to his command.

Foster transferred to his flagship, the submarine tender Bushnell and was promoted to the temporary rank of lieutenant on July 1, 1917. He served first as ship's navigator under Commander Wilhelm L. Friedell and took part in the deployment of submarines to the Azores in early autumn 1917. Foster was later appointed an aide to Captain Hart and participated in the patrols in Atlantic, before he was appointed commanding officer of the submarine L-2 in March 1918.

He took part in patrols to Bishop Rock Lighthouse off the England coast and Bantry Bay, Ireland, and later received orders for patrol the Bay of Biscay, north of Bordeaux. During the patrol in mid-July 1918, Foster's submarine had one of her engines damaged and was ordered back to the submarine base at Bantry Bay. On her return, Foster's crew spotted German SM UB-65 near Fastnet Rock, which Foster first took to be a buoy on the horizon. Moving closer, he found that it was actually a German submarine, only later to be identified as UB-65. It was listing heavily on the water's surface, seemingly disabled. Forster guided his sub around it, hoping to line up a torpedo shot. But before he could do so, the crippled vessel was torn apart by a huge explosion. UB-65 rose up on its bows and sank. There were no survivors and no bodies were ever recovered.

Foster was subsequently decorated with the Navy Distinguished Service Medal for his part in the sinking of the enemy submarine. It was one of three enemy submarines officially listed as sunk by the U.S. Navy. He was also promoted to the temporary rank of lieutenant commander on July 1, 1918.

== Interwar period ==
Following the Armistice, Foster was transferred to the staff of Commander, Division 2, Submarine Force, Atlantic Fleet, and served under Harold M. Bemis until late 1920, when he joined the protected cruiser San Francisco, under Captain Henry E. Lackey. He participated in the patrols in west Atlantic and the Caribbean and was transferred to the Navy Recruiting Bureau in New York City in July 1921.

In April 1924, Foster was ordered to the Philadelphia Navy Yard for duty in connection with the fitting out of the light cruiser Trenton and, upon her commissioning, he was appointed the ship's engineering officer under Captain Edward C. Kalbfus. Foster took part in the shakedown cruise to the Mediterranean Sea and Port Said, Egypt; Aden, Arabia; and Bushehr, Persia, where the remains of the assassinated Vice Consul Robert Imbrie were taken aboard.

By the end of October 1924, Trenton was conducting gunnery drills off the Virginia Capes near Norfolk, but powder bags in her forward turret exploded, killing or injuring every member of the gun crew. Noting the difficulties of rescuing the men in the turret through the access door and extinguishing the fire from the forecastle, and with total disregard for his own safety, Foster entered the turret from the upper handling rooms, took the fire hose which was passed to him from without and extinguished the fire in the turret and on the clothing of the members of the crew. For this act of valor, he was decorated with the Navy Cross.

Trenton was repaired shortly thereafter and returned to patrols along the East Coast of the United States. She was later attached to the Scouting Fleet off Guantánamo Bay, Cuba, and took part in gunnery exercises off the Panama Canal Zone. Foster was detached in July 1927 and ordered back to New York City, where he was attached to the headquarters of Third Naval District, under Rear Admiral Charles P. Plunkett.

At the beginning of Great Depression, Foster resigned from active duty at his own request in March 1929 and was active in various civilian organizations, some directly involved with U.S. military functions. In 1941, Foster surveyed resources of the Galapagos Islands for the Pacific Development Company. He remained a member of the United States Naval Reserve and received the Naval Reserve Medal for 10 years of service with the reserves.

== World War II ==
Following the Japanese attack on Pearl Harbor and the United States entry into World War II, Foster was recalled to active duty with the rank of commander in the Naval Reserve and was tasked directly by President Franklin D. Roosevelt to conduct special naval inspections. One of his first mission was to conduct an investigation in the Panama Canal Zone following the series of complaints from the Army's Lieutenant General Daniel Van Voorhis, commander of Caribbean Defense Command on Army-Navy cooperation.

Foster arrived to Balboa and after few weeks, he concluded that Rear Admiral Frank H. Sadler, commandant of the Fifteenth Naval District, was the main reason of the lack of effective cooperation with the Army. Foster recommended Sadler be relieved of command and be succeeded by some able and younger officer who would improve the relations with the Army.

Upon his return stateside, Foster was promoted to captain and was assigned to the Logistics Plans Division of the Office of the Chief of Naval Operations. He was later transferred to the recently created Office of General Inspector of the Navy, under Admiral Charles P. Snyder. He was later promoted to rear admiral and appointed Assistant Naval Inspector General in August 1943.

Foster then conducted inspections and investigations of naval districts, Sea Frontiers, Naval Air Training Commands, and shore-based activities in the United States, as well in Pacific or Atlantic areas, until September 1945 and received Legion of Merit and Navy Commendation Medal for his service during the War. He was transferred to the inactive list of the Navy in October 1946 and was advanced to the rank of vice admiral on the retired list for having been specially commended in combat.

== Postwar career ==
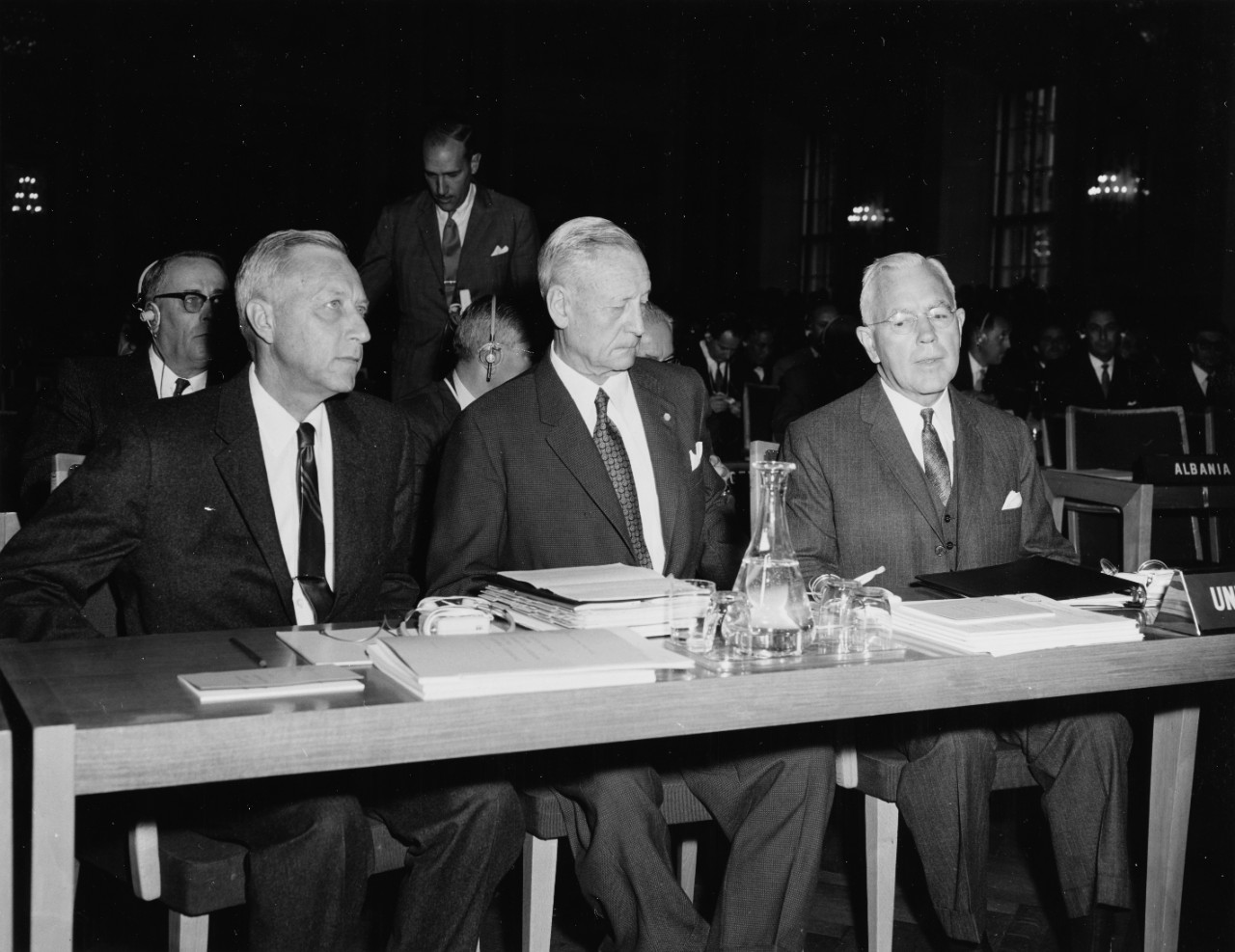
Foster (center) as U.S. Representative to the International Atomic Energy Agency in Vienna, Austria, c. 1960. Others are John Stephens Graham (left) and John A. McCone.

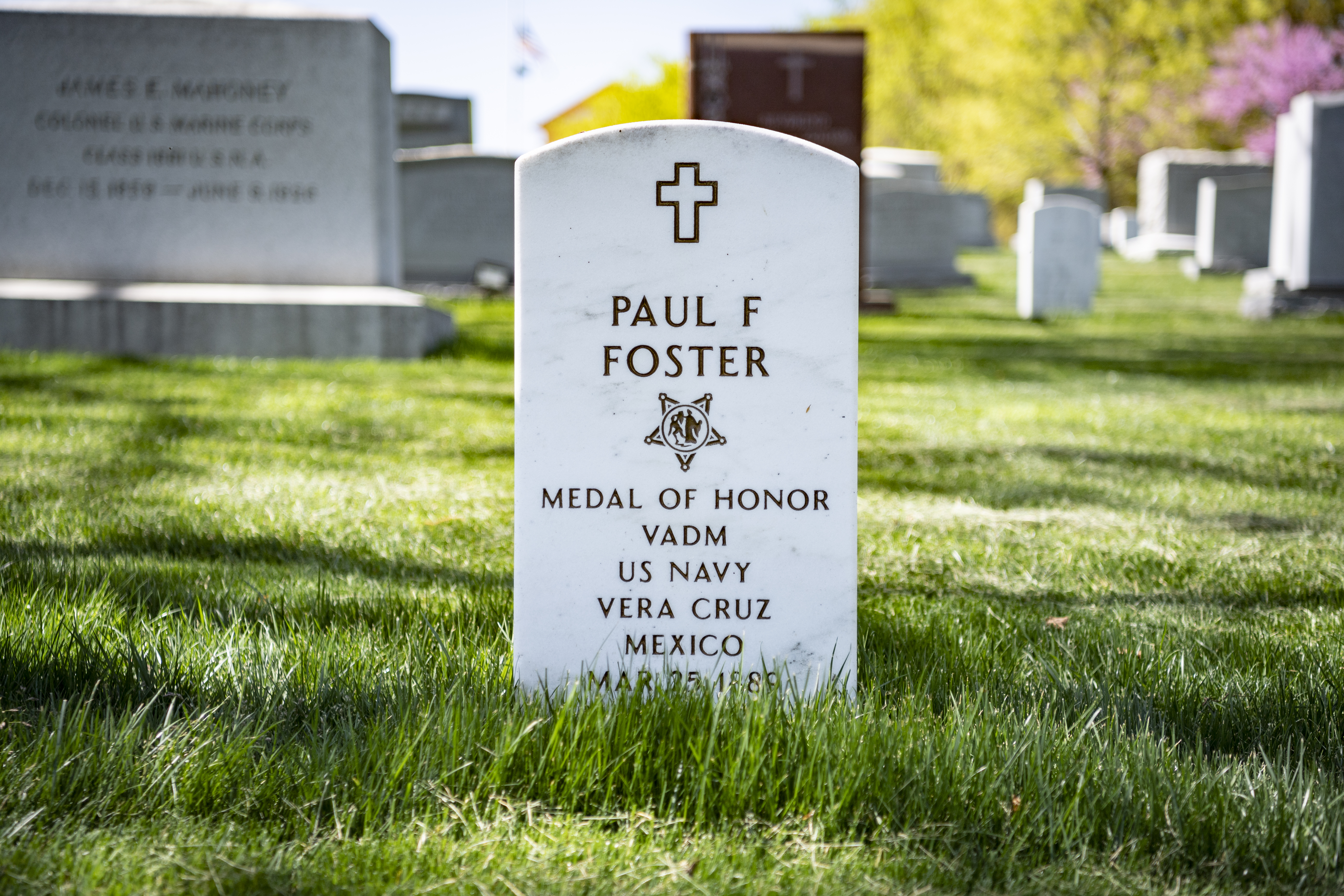
Grave at Arlington National Cemetery

Following his second retirement from the Navy, Foster became vice president of Mandel Brothers, Inc., a department store company in Chicago, Illinois, and served in this capacity until late 1950. He then worked for the International Bank for Reconstruction and Development in Washington, D.C., until June 1954, when was appointed special assistant to the general manager for international activities, Atomic Energy Commission (AEC), which was established to foster and control the peacetime development of atomic science and technology.

Foster is promoted to acting general manager of the commission in July 1957 and held that assignment until June of the following year. He then resumed his job as special assistant to the general manager and remained in that capacity until February 1959. For his service with the Atomic Energy Commission, he was decorated with the AEC Distinguished Service Award.

One month later, President Dwight D. Eisenhower appointed Foster Permanent U.S. Representative to the International Atomic Energy Agency, with headquarters in Vienna, Austria. In this capacity he participated in Fourth General Conference in Vienna in the early 1960s and had the opportunity to meet Pope John XXIII.

== Retirement and death ==
Foster retired in April 1961 and settled in Virginia Beach, Virginia, where he died at his home on January 30, 1972, aged 82. He was buried at Arlington National Cemetery, Virginia, and his wife, Isabelle De La Vicendiere Lowe (1892–1981) is buried beside him. They had one son, Paul.

The Spruance-class destroyer USS Paul F. Foster was named in his honor in 1976.

== Decorations ==
Here is the ribbon bar of Vice Admiral Paul F. Foster:

Submarine Warfare insignia
1st Row	Medal of Honor	Navy Cross	Navy Distinguished Service Medal
2nd Row	Legion of Merit	Navy Commendation Medal	Mexican Service Medal
3rd Row	World War I Victory Medal with Submarine Clasp	American Campaign Medal	Asiatic–Pacific Campaign Medal
4th Row	European–African–Middle Eastern; Campaign Medal	World War II Victory Medal	Naval Reserve Medal

=== Medal of Honor citation ===
Rank and organization: Ensign Organization: U.S. Navy Born: Wichita, Kans. Entered service at: Kansas Place/Date: Vera Cruz, Mexico, 21 and 22 April 1914 Date of issue: 12/04/1915

Citation:

For distinguished conduct in battle, engagements of Vera Cruz, 21 and 22 April 1914. In both days' fighting at the head of his company, Ens. Foster was eminent and conspicuous in his conduct, leading his men with skill and courage.

== See also ==
- List of Medal of Honor recipients (Veracruz)
- List of United States Naval Academy alumni (Medal of Honor)
