= Admiral Lowry =

Admiral Lowry may refer to:

- Frank J. Lowry (1888–1955), U.S. Navy vice admiral
- George M. Lowry (1889–1981), U.S. Navy rear admiral
- Robert Lowry (Royal Navy officer) (1854–1920), British Royal Navy admiral
