= Walter Newell Hill =

United States Marine Corps general

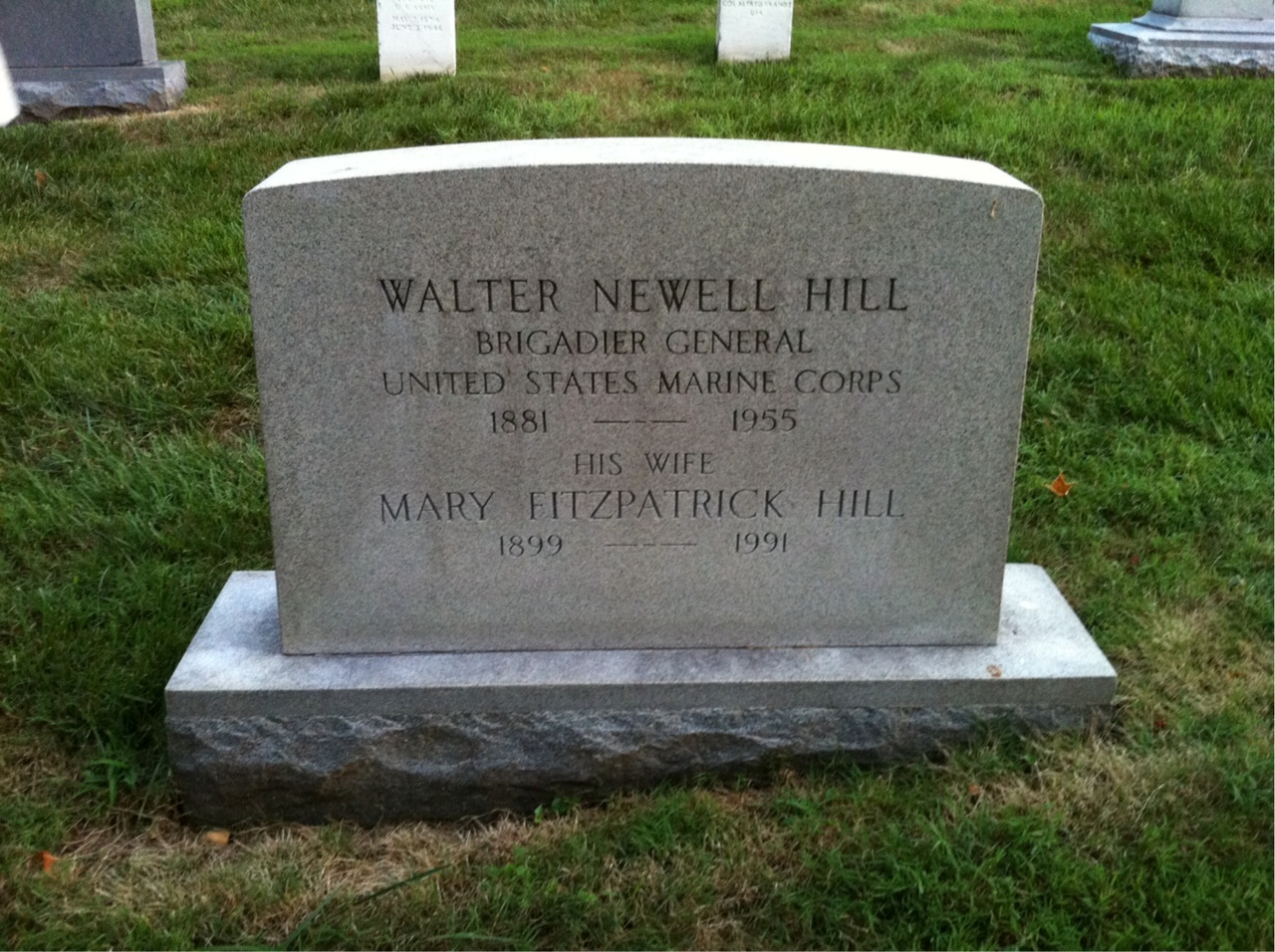
- Grave at Arlington National Cemetery
- Born: September 29, 1881; Haverhill, Massachusetts, US
- Died: June 29, 1955 (aged 73); New York City, US
- Burial place: Arlington National Cemetery
- Military career
- Allegiance: United States of America
- Branch: United States Marine Corps
- Service years: 1904–1938, 1942–1945
- Rank: Brigadier general
- Conflicts: Banana Wars: Second Occupation of Cuba; Haitian Campaign; Dominican Campaign; Veracruz Expedition; World War I World War II
- Awards: Medal of Honor

Walter Newell Hill (September 29, 1881 – June 29, 1955) was a highly decorated officer in the United States Marine Corps and a Medal of Honor recipient for his role in the United States occupation of Veracruz. He subsequently served in the Marine Corps for 37 years, including service in Haitian Campaign and World War II.

== Biography ==
Walter N. Hill was born September 29, 1881, in Haverhill, Massachusetts, and attended Noble & Greenough School in Dedham, Massachusetts. He subsequently attended Harvard College and graduated with Bachelor of Arts degree in 1904. Hill joined the Marine Corps on February 1, 1904, and was commissioned second lieutenant on the same date. He attended the School of Application and after graduation was assigned to the Norfolk Navy Yard, Virginia. When the situation on Cuba became worse, he was assigned to the Marine detachment aboard the battleship USS Massachusetts and sailed there. Hill was promoted to the rank of first lieutenant in June 1906 and participated in Second Occupation of Cuba with 1st Provisional Regiment of Marines.

He returned to the United States in January 1909 and after brief tour of duty was transferred to the 1st Brigade of Marines and sailed for Philippines in July 1909. Hill was subsequently assigned to the detachment aboard gunboat USS Helena and sailed for Hankou, China to protect Standard Oil Company property. He remained in China until January 1912 and returned to the States.

Throughout his more than 40-year career he served in the West Indies, Philippines, China, and France in World War I. He was recalled to active duty in January 1942, and served at Marine Corps Headquarters with the Naval Examining Board until the end of World War II.

He died June 29, 1955, at St. Albans Naval Hospital, New York City, New York and is buried at Arlington National Cemetery, Arlington, Virginia. His grave can be found in section 6, lot 9646-C.

== Medal of Honor citation ==
Rank and organization: Captain, U.S. Marine Corps. Born: 29 September 1881, Haverhill, Mass. Appointed from: Massachusetts. G.O. No.: 177, 4 December 1915.

Citation:

For distinguished conduct in battle, engagements of Vera Cruz, 21 and 22 April 1914. Capt. Hill was in both days' fighting at the head of his company, and was eminent and conspicuous in his conduct, leading his men with skill and courage.

== Decorations ==
Here is the ribbon bar of Brigadier General Walter Newell Hill:

1st Row	Medal of Honor		Marine Corps Expeditionary Medal	
2nd Row	Cuban Pacification Medal	Mexican Service Medal	Dominican Campaign Medal	Haitian Campaign Medal with one star
3rd Row	World War I Victory Medal with one Battle clasp	American Campaign Medal	World War II Victory Medal	Haitian Médaille militaire with Diploma

== See also ==
- List of Medal of Honor recipients (Veracruz)
