= General Read =

General Read or Reade may refer to:

- Antony Read (1913–2000), British Army general
- George Reade (MP) (1687–1756), British Army lieutenant general
- George Windle Read Jr. (1900–1974), U.S. Army lieutenant general
- George Windle Read (1860–1934), U.S. Army major general
- John Read (British Army officer) (1917–1987), British Army lieutenant general
- Raymond Reade (1861–1943), British Army major general

== See also ==
- General Reed (disambiguation)
- General Reid (disambiguation)
