= John Grady (Medal of Honor) =

US Navy officer and Medal of Honor recipient (1872–1956)

- Born: December 25, 1872; New Brunswick, Canada
- Died: December 9, 1956 (aged 83)
- Burial place: Arlington National Cemetery, Arlington, Virginia
- Military career
- Allegiance: United States of America
- Branch: United States Navy
- Service years: 1890–1922
- Rank: Captain
- Conflicts: United States occupation of Veracruz; Spanish–American War; World War I
- Awards: Medal of Honor; Navy Cross

John Grady (December 25, 1872 – December 9, 1956) was a Lieutenant in the United States Navy and a Medal of Honor recipient for his role in the United States occupation of Veracruz.

He died December 9, 1956, and is buried at Arlington National Cemetery, Arlington, Virginia.

== Medal of Honor citation ==
Rank and organization: Lieutenant, U.S. Navy. Born: 25 December 1872, Canada. Appointed from: Massachusetts. G.O. No.: 177, 4 December 1915. Other Navy award: Navy Cross.

Citation:

For distinguished conduct in battle, engagement of Vera Cruz, 22 April 1914. During the second day's fighting, the service performed by Lt. Grady, in command of the 2d Regiment, Artillery, was eminent and conspicuous. From necessarily exposed positions, he shelled the enemy from the strongest position.

== Navy cross citation ==
Citation:

The President of the United States of America takes pleasure in presenting the Navy Cross to Commander John Grady, United States Navy, for distinguished service in the line of his profession as Commanding Officer of the U.S.S. WILHELMINA, engaged in the important, exacting and hazardous duty of transporting and escorting troops and supplies to European ports through waters infested with enemy submarines and mines during World War I.

== See also ==
- List of Medal of Honor recipients (Veracruz)
