= Berrie H. Jarrett =

United States Navy Medal of Honor recipient (1894–1927)

- Born: June 10, 1894; Baltimore, Maryland, U.S.
- Died: August 14, 1927 (aged 33); Norfolk, Virginia, U.S.
- Burial place: Lorraine Park Cemetery, Woodlawn, Maryland
- Military career
- Allegiance: United States
- Branch: United States Navy
- Rank: Gunner
- Conflicts: United States occupation of Veracruz
- Awards: Medal of Honor

Berrie Henry Jarrett (June 10, 1894 – August 14, 1927) was a warrant officer in the United States Navy and a Medal of Honor recipient for his role in the United States occupation of Veracruz.

He was promoted to the warrant officer rank of gunner on December 12, 1923.

He died August 14, 1927, and is buried in Lorraine Park Cemetery, Woodlawn, Maryland.

== Medal of Honor citation ==
Rank and organization: Seaman, U.S. Navy. Born: 10 June 1894 Baltimore, Md. Accredited to: Maryland. G.O. No.: 116, 19 August 1914.

Citation:

On board the U.S.S. Florida Jarrett displayed extraordinary heroism in the line of his profession during the seizure of Vera Cruz, Mexico, 21 April 1914.

== See also ==
- List of Medal of Honor recipients (Veracruz)
