= General Reed =

General Reed may refer to:

- Hamilton Reed (1869–1931), British Army major general
- James Reed (soldier) (c. 1724–1807), Continental Army brigadier general
- Joseph Reed (politician) (1741–1785), Adjutant-General of the Continental Army
- Randall Reed (fl. 1980s–2020s), U.S. Air Force major general
- Robert H. Reed (1929–2017), U.S. Air Force general
- Thomas Reed (British Army officer) (1796–1883), British Army general
- Walter D. Reed (1924–2022), U.S. Air Force major general
- Walter L. Reed (1877–1956), U.S. Army major general

== See also ==
- Attorney General Reed (disambiguation)
- General Read (disambiguation)
- General Reid (disambiguation)
