= List of Medal of Honor recipients (Veracruz) =

The United States occupation of the Mexican port of Veracruz lasted for seven months in 1914 and occurred in the midst of poor diplomatic relations between Mexico and the United States, related to the ongoing Mexican Revolution.

In response to the Tampico Affair, President Woodrow Wilson ordered the U.S. Navy to prepare for the occupation of the port of Veracruz. While waiting for authorization of Congress to carry out such action, Wilson was alerted to a German delivery of weapons for Victoriano Huerta due to arrive to the port on April 21. As a result, Wilson issued an immediate order to seize the port's customs office and confiscate the weaponry.

The Medal of Honor was created during the American Civil War and is the highest military decoration presented by the United States government to a member of its armed forces. The recipient must have distinguished themselves at the risk of their own life above and beyond the call of duty in action against an enemy of the United States. Due to the nature of this medal, it is commonly presented posthumously.

Secretary of the Navy Josephus Daniels ordered that 56 Medals of Honor be awarded to participants in the occupation of Veracruz, the most for any single action before or since. In total 56 Medals of Honor were received for actions during the occupation; 1 Army, 9 to members of the United States Marine Corps and 46 to Navy personnel.

== Recipients ==
Note: Notes in quotations are derived or are copied from the official Medal of Honor citation

Image	Name	Service	Rank	Place of action	Date of action	Notes
Edwin Anderson Jr.	Edwin Anderson, Jr.	Navy	Captain	Veracruz, Mexico	April 22, 1914	Showed extraordinary heroism in battle, during the engagement of Veracruz, April 22, 1914, in command of the Second Seaman Regiment
Oscar C. Badger II	Oscar C. Badger II	Navy	Ensign	Veracruz, Mexico	April 21, 1914 – April 22, 1914	Led his men in both days' fighting at the head of his company
—	Harry C. Beasley	Navy	Seaman	aboard USS Florida, Veracruz, Mexico	April 21, 1914	For "extraordinary heroism in the line of his profession". Later killed in the line of duty as a police officer
Randolph C. Berkeley	Randolph C. Berkeley	Marine Corps	Major	Veracruz, Mexico	April 21, 1914 – April 22, 1914	"For distinguished conduct in battle, engagements of Veracruz, 21 – 22 April 1914"; was eminent and conspicuous in command of his battalion; was in the fighting of both days, and exhibited courage and his skill in leading his men through action. His cool judgment and courage and his skill in handling his men in encountering and overcoming the machine gun and rifle fire down Cinco de Mayo and parallel streets accounts for the small percentage of the losses of Marines under his command.
—	Charles Francis Bishop	Navy	Quartermaster Second Class	aboard USS Florida, Veracruz, Mexico	April 21, 1914	For "extraordinary heroism in the line of his profession"
George Bradley	George Bradley	Navy	Chief Gunner's Mate	Veracruz, Mexico	April 21, 1914	For meritorious service under fire as leader of the ammunition party and special details
Allen Buchanan	Allen Buchanan	Navy	Lieutenant Commander	Veracruz, Mexico	April 21, 1914 – April 22, 1914	"For distinguished conduct in battle, engagements of Veracruz, 21 – 22 April 1914"
Smedley Butler	Smedley Butler	Marine Corps	Major	Veracruz, Mexico	April 22, 1914	"For distinguished conduct in battle, engagement of Veracruz, April 22, 1914". Later received a second Medal of Honor for actions in Haiti in 1915.
Guy W. S. Castle	Guy Wilkinson Stuart Castle	Navy	Lieutenant	Veracruz, Mexico	April 21, 1914 – April 22, 1914	"For distinguished conduct in battle, engagements of Veracruz, 21 – 22 April 1914"
Albertus W. Catlin	Albertus W. Catlin	Marine Corps	Major	Veracruz, Mexico	April 22, 1914	"For distinguished conduct in battle, engagement of Veracruz, April 22, 1914". He exhibited courage and skill in leading his men through the action and in the final occupation of the city.
George M. Courts	George McCall Courts	Navy	Lieutenant	Veracruz, Mexico	April 21, 1914 – April 22, 1914	"For distinguished conduct in battle, engagements of Veracruz, 21 – 22 April 1914"
—	George Cregan	Navy	Coxswain	aboard USS Florida, Veracruz, Mexico	April 21, 1914	On board USS Florida, for extraordinary heroism in the line of his profession during the seizure of Veracruz, Mexico, April 21, 1914.
—	Percy A. Decker	Navy	Boatswain's Mate Second Class	aboard USS Florida, Veracruz, Mexico	April 21, 1914	For "extraordinary heroism in the line of his profession"
Abraham DeSomer	Abraham DeSomer	Navy	Chief Petty Officer	Veracruz, Mexico	April 21, 1914 – April 22, 1914	For "extraordinary heroism in the line of his profession"
—	Niels Drustrup	Navy	Chief Petty Officer	Veracruz, Mexico	April 21, 1914	For meritorious service under fire on the occasion of landing of the naval forces at Veracruz, Mexico, on April 21, 1914
—	Jesse Farley Dyer	Marine Corps	Captain	Veracruz, Mexico	April 21, 1914 – April 22, 1914	"For distinguished conduct in battle, engagements of Veracruz, 21 – 22 April 1914"; was in both days fighting at the head of his company, and was eminent and conspicuous in his conduct, leading his men with skill and courage.
—	Middleton Stuart Elliott	Navy	Surgeon	Veracruz, Mexico	April 21, 1914 – April 22, 1914	"For distinguished conduct in battle, engagements of Veracruz, 21 – 22 April 1914"
Frank F. Fletcher	Frank Friday Fletcher	Navy	Rear Admiral	Veracruz, Mexico	April 21, 1914 – April 22, 1914	Directed the landing at Veracruz, Mexico
Frank J. Fletcher	Frank Jack Fletcher	Navy	Lieutenant	Veracruz, Mexico	April 21, 1914 – April 22, 1914	"For distinguished conduct in battle, engagements of Veracruz, 21 – 22 April 1914"
Paul F. Foster	Paul Frederick Foster	Navy	Ensign	Veracruz, Mexico	April 21, 1914 – April 22, 1914	"For distinguished conduct in battle, engagements of Veracruz, 21 – 22 April 1914"
Hugh C. Frazer	Hugh Carroll Frazer	Navy	Ensign	Veracruz, Mexico	April 22, 1914	"For extraordinary heroism in battle, engagement of Veracruz, April 22, 1914"
Eli T. Fryer	Eli Thompson Fryer	Marine Corps	Captain	Veracruz, Mexico	April 21, 1914 – April 22, 1914	"For distinguished conduct in battle, engagements of Veracruz, 21 – 22 April 1914"
Julien E. V. Gaujot	Julien Edmund Victor Gaujot	Army	Captain	Aqua Prieta, Mexico	April 13, 1911	Brother of Antoine A. M. Gaujot, also a Medal of Honor recipient. One of five pairs of brothers to have both received the Medal of Honor.
Round portrait of a young man dressed in a suit and with neatly combed hair.	Edward A. Gisburne	Navy	Electrician Third Class	aboard USS Florida, Veracruz, Mexico	April 21, 1914 – April 22, 1914	For "extraordinary heroism in the line of his profession"
	John Grady	Navy	Lieutenant	Veracruz, Mexico	April 22, 1914	"For distinguished conduct in battle, engagement of Veracruz, April 22, 1914"
—	Joseph Gabriel Harner	Navy	Boatswain's Mate Second Class	aboard USS Florida, Veracruz, Mexico	April 21, 1914	For "extraordinary heroism in the line of his profession"
William K. Harrison	William Kelly Harrison	Navy	Commander	Veracruz, Mexico	April 21, 1914 – April 22, 1914	"For distinguished conduct in battle, engagements of Veracruz, 21 – 22 April 1914"
Charles C. Hartigan	Charles Conway Hartigan	Navy	Lieutenant	Veracruz, Mexico	April 22, 1914	"For distinguished conduct in battle, engagement of Veracruz, April 22, 1914"
—	Walter Newell Hill	Marine Corps	Captain	Veracruz, Mexico	April 21, 1914 – April 22, 1914	"For distinguished conduct in battle, engagements of Veracruz, 21 – 22 April 1914"
—	John Arthur Hughes	Marine Corps	Captain	Veracruz, Mexico	April 21, 1914 – April 22, 1914	"For distinguished conduct in battle, engagements of Veracruz, 21 – 22 April 1914"
Harry M. P. Huse	Harry M. P. Huse	Navy	Captain	Veracruz, Mexico	April 21, 1914 – April 22, 1914	First name erroneously given as "Henry" on citation
Jonas H. Ingram	Jonas H. Ingram	Navy	Lieutenant	Veracruz, Mexico	April 22, 1914	For distinguished conduct in battle, engagement of Veracruz, April 22, 1914. During the second day's fighting the service performed by him was eminent and conspicuous. He was conspicuous for skilful and efficient handling of the artillery and machine-guns of the Arkansas battalion, for which he was specially commended in reports.
—	Berrie H. Jarrett	Navy	Seaman	aboard USS Florida, Veracruz, Mexico	April 21, 1914	On board USS Florida Jarrett displayed extraordinary heroism in the line of his profession during the seizure of Veracruz, Mexico, April 21, 1914.
Rufus Z. Johnston	Rufus Zenas Johnston	Navy	Lieutenant Commander	Veracruz, Mexico	April 22, 1914	"For distinguished conduct in battle, engagement of Veracruz, April 22, 1914"
Cary D. Langhorne	Cary DeVall Langhorne	Navy	Surgeon	Veracruz, Mexico	April 22, 1914	For carrying a wounded man while under heavy fire.
James P. Lannon	James Patrick Lannon	Navy	Lieutenant	Veracruz, Mexico	April 22, 1914	For extraordinary heroism in battle, engagement of Veracruz, April 22, 1914. Lt. Lannon assisted a wounded man under heavy fire, and after returning to his battalion was himself desperately wounded.
George M. Lowry	George M. Lowry	Navy	Ensign	Veracruz, Mexico	April 21, 1914 – April 22, 1914	For distinguished conduct in battle, engagements of Veracruz, 21 – 22 April 1914; Ens. Lowry was in both days' fighting at the head of his company, and was eminent and conspicuous in his conduct, leading his men with skill and courage. Last surviving recipient.
—	John C. McCloy	Navy	Chief Boatswain	Veracruz, Mexico	April 22, 1914	For heroism in leading 3 attacks along Veracruz sea front, drawing Mexican fire and enabling cruisers to save our men on shore, April 22, 1914. Though wounded, he gallantly remained at his post. Second award – previously awarded a Medal of Honor for action in the Boxer Rebellion.
Edward O. McDonnell	Edward Orrick McDonnell	Navy	Ensign	Veracruz, Mexico	April 21, 1914 – April 22, 1914	"For extraordinary heroism in battle, engagements of Veracruz, 21 – 22 April 1914". Established a signal station to ensure communication between troops and ships whilst under continual fire at an exposed post.
Frederick V. McNair Jr.	Frederick V. McNair, Jr.	Navy	Lieutenant	Veracruz, Mexico	April 22, 1914	For distinguished conduct in battle engagement of Veracruz, April 22, 1914. Lt. McNair was eminent and conspicuous in command of his battalion. He exhibited courage and skill in leading his men through the action and in the final occupation of the city.
William A. Moffett	William A. Moffett	Navy	Commander	USS Chester, harbor of Veracruz, Mexico	April 21, 1914 – April 22, 1914	For his leadership of USS Chester in a daring and dangerous night landing in 1914 at Veracruz, Veracruz, Mexico
Wendell C. Neville	Wendell Cushing Neville	Marine Corps	Lieutenant Colonel	Veracruz, Mexico	April 21, 1914 – April 22, 1914	For distinguished conduct in battle engagements of Veracruz 21 – 22 April 1914
—	Henry Nehemiah Nickerson	Navy	Boatswain's Mate Second Class	Veracruz, Mexico	April 21, 1914	For "extraordinary heroism in the line of his profession"
—	Charles Luers Nordsiek	Navy	Ordinary Seaman	aboard USS Florida, Veracruz, Mexico	April 21, 1914 – April 22, 1914	For "extraordinary heroism in the line of his profession"
George Croghan Reid	George Croghan Reid	Marine Corps	Major	Veracruz, Mexico	April 21, 1914 – April 22, 1914	"For distinguished conduct in battle, engagements of Veracruz, 21 – 22 April 1914"
William R. Rush	William R. Rush	Navy	Captain	Veracruz, Mexico	April 21, 1914 – April 22, 1914	For his bravery in battle in Veracruz Mexico
—	Fred Jurgen Schnepel	Navy	Ordinary Seaman	aboard USS Florida, Veracruz, Mexico	April 21, 1914 – April 22, 1914	For "extraordinary heroism in the line of his profession"
—	Robert Semple	Navy	Chief Gunner	Veracruz, Mexico	April 21, 1914	For meritorious service under fire
—	Lawrence C. Sinnett	Navy	Seaman	aboard USS Florida, Veracruz, Mexico	April 21, 1914	For "extraordinary heroism in the line of his profession"
Adolphus Staton	Adolphus Staton	Navy	Lieutenant	Veracruz, Mexico	April 22, 1914	"For distinguished conduct in battle, engagement of Veracruz, April 22, 1914"
Herman O. Stickney	Herman Osman Stickney	Navy	Commander	Veracruz, Mexico	April 21, 1914 – April 22, 1914	"For distinguished conduct in battle, engagements of Veracruz, 21 – 22 April 1914"
Julius C. Townsend	Julius Curtis Townsend	Navy	Lieutenant	Veracruz, Mexico	April 22, 1914	"For distinguished conduct in battle, engagement of Veracruz, April 22, 1914"
Richard Wainwright Jr.	Richard Wainwright, Jr.	Navy	Lieutenant	Veracruz, Mexico	April 21, 1914 – April 22, 1914	"For distinguished conduct in battle, engagements of Veracruz, 21 – 22 April 1914"
—	James A. Walsh	Navy	Seaman	aboard USS Florida, Veracruz, Mexico	April 21, 1914 – April 22, 1914	For "extraordinary heroism in the line of his profession"
Theodore S. Wilkinson	Theodore S. Wilkinson	Navy	Ensign	Veracruz, Mexico	April 21, 1914 – April 22, 1914	For his skillful and courageous leadership of USS Florida's landing force and his exhibition of "eminent and conspicuous" conduct.
William Zuiderveld	William Zuiderveld	Navy	Hospital Apprentice First Class	Veracruz, Mexico	April 21, 1914	For "extraordinary heroism in the line of his profession"
