= Attorney General Reed =

Attorney General Reed may refer to:

- Joseph Reed (lawyer) (1772–1846), Attorney General of Pennsylvania
- Thomas Brackett Reed (1839–1902), Attorney General of Maine
- William Bradford Reed (1806–1876), Attorney General of Pennsylvania
- Thomas Buck Reed (1787–1829), Attorney General of Mississippi
- Chester I. Reed (1823–1873), Attorney General of Massachusetts
- Frederick M. Reed (1924–2012), Attorney General of Vermont

== See also ==
- Thomas Read (politician) (1881–1962), Attorney General of Michigan
- Attorney General Reid (disambiguation)
- General Reed (disambiguation)
