= Niels Drustrup =

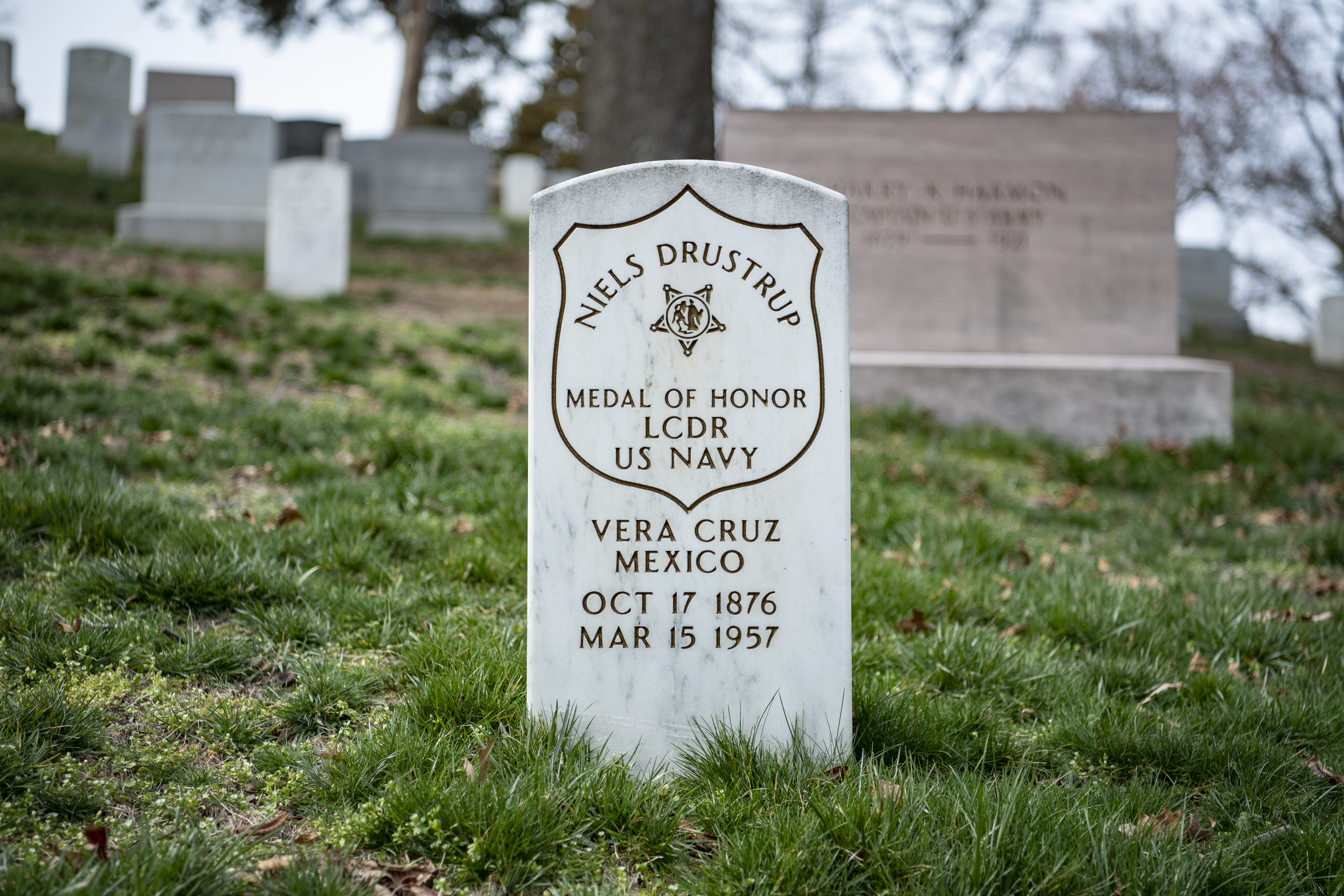
- Grave at Arlington National Cemetery
- Born: October 17, 1876; Denmark
- Died: March 15, 1957 (aged 80)
- Burial place: Arlington National Cemetery
- Military career
- Allegiance: United States of America
- Branch: United States Navy
- Service years: 1900 - 1930
- Rank: Lieutenant Commander
- Unit: USS Utah
- Conflicts: Mexican Revolution; *Battle of Veracruz; World War I
- Awards: Medal of Honor

Niels Drustrup (October 17, 1876 – March 15, 1957) was an officer in the United States Navy and a Medal of Honor recipient for his role in the United States occupation of Veracruz.

== Biography ==
Niels Drustrup was born in Denmark, emigrated to the United States and enlisted the United States Navy on February 6, 1900.

In 1914 Drustrup was attached to the U.S.S. Utah as a chief turret captain. On April 21 the Navy landed sailors and marines at Veracruz, Mexico, to occupy the city. Drustrup was later (in 1924) awarded the Medal of Honor for meritorious service under fire for several hours when he was in charge of an advanced barricade under a heavy fire.

Drustrup was warranted to the rank of gunner on February 18, 1915, and received a temporary promotion to lieutenant on September 21, 1918.

He received a permanent promotion to lieutenant on August 3, 1920, and retired from the Navy on 6 February 1930.

Lieutenant Drustrup died on March 15, 1957, and is buried at Arlington National Cemetery, Arlington, Virginia. His grave can be found in section 3, lot 4378-RH.

== Awards ==
- Medal of Honor
- Good Conduct Medal
- Mexican Service Medal
- World War I Victory Medal

=== Medal of Honor citation ===
Rank and organization: Lieutenant, U.S. Navy. Born: 17 October 1876, Denmark. Accredited to: Pennsylvania. G.O. No.: 131, 17 July 1924.

Citation:

For meritorious service under fire on the occasion of landing of the naval forces at Vera Cruz, Mexico, on 21 April 1914. For several hours Lt. Drustrup was in charge of an advanced barricade under a heavy fire, and not only displayed utmost ability as a leader of men but also exerted a great steadying influence on the men around him. Lt. Drustrup was then attached to the U.S.S. Utah as a chief turret captain.

== See also ==
- List of Medal of Honor recipients (Veracruz)
