= Jesse Farley Dyer =

United States Marine Corps Medal of Honor recipient

Jesse F. Dyer
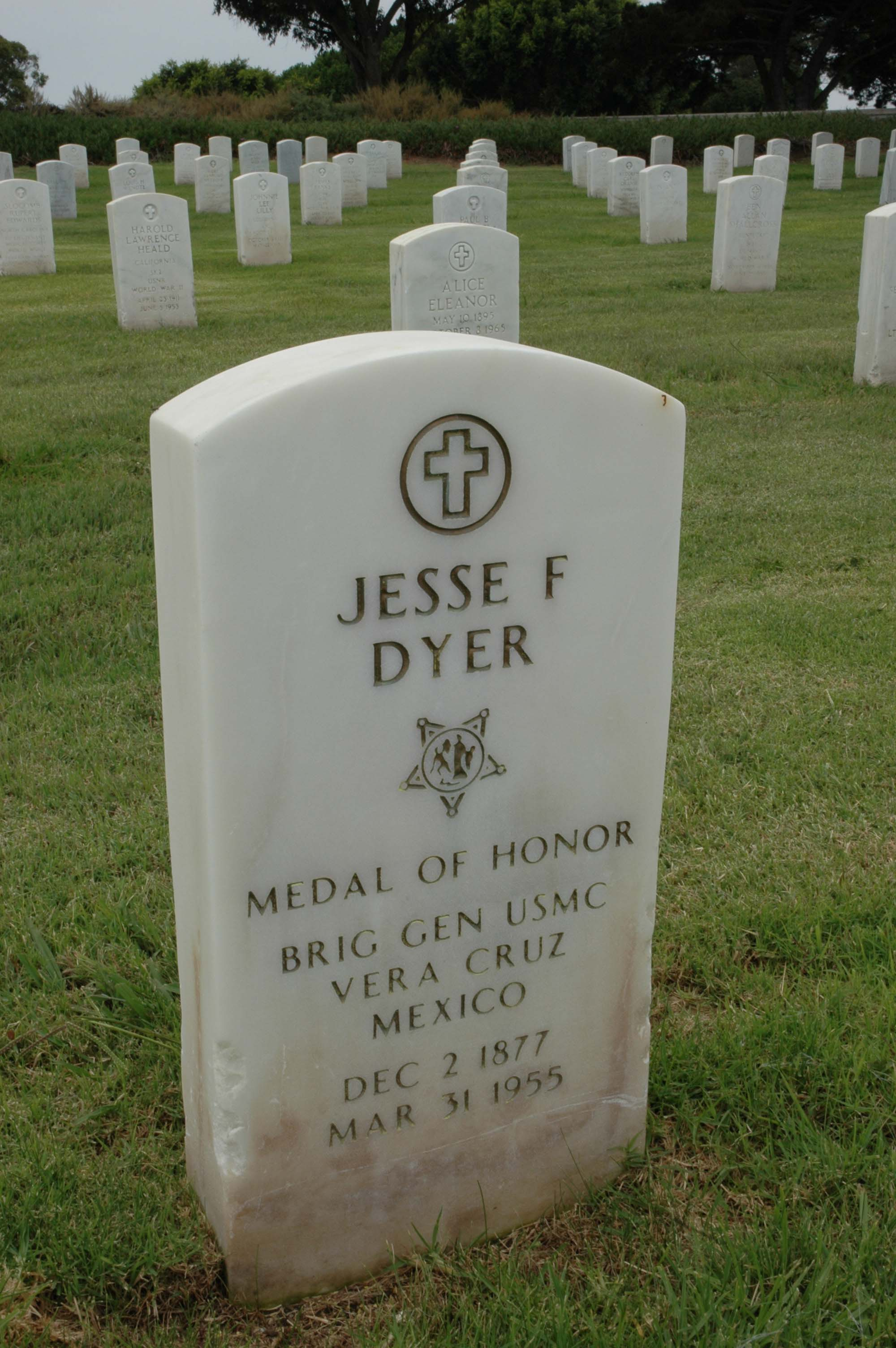
- Grave at Fort Rosecrans National Cemetery
- Born: December 2, 1877; St. Paul, Minnesota, US
- Died: March 31, 1955 (aged 77); Corona, California, US
- Burial place: Fort Rosecrans National Cemetery, San Diego, California; 32.4116096, -117.1465225
- Military career
- Allegiance: United States of America
- Branch: United States Marine Corps
- Service years: 1903 - 1937
- Rank: Brigadier General
- Conflicts: United States occupation of Veracruz
- Awards: Medal of Honor

Jesse Farley Dyer (December 2, 1877 –March 31, 1955) was an officer in the United States Marine Corps and a Medal of Honor recipient for his role in the United States occupation of Veracruz.

Dyer was commissioned in the Marine Corps in 1903, and retired in 1937. He died on March 31, 1955, and is buried at Fort Rosecrans National Cemetery, San Diego, California. His grave can be found in section P, grave 1606.

== Medal of Honor citation ==
Rank and organization: Brigadier General, U.S. Marine Corps. Born: 2 December 1877, St. Paul, Minn. Appointed from: Minnesota. G.O. No.: 177, 4 December 1915.

Citation:

For distinguished conduct in battle, engagements of Vera Cruz, 21 and 22 April 1914; was in both days fighting at the head of his company, and was eminent and conspicuous in his conduct, leading his men with skill and courage.

== See also ==
- List of Medal of Honor recipients
- List of Medal of Honor recipients (Veracruz)
