= Percy A. Decker =

US Navy officer and Medal of Honor recipient (1890–1936)

Percy Austin Decker
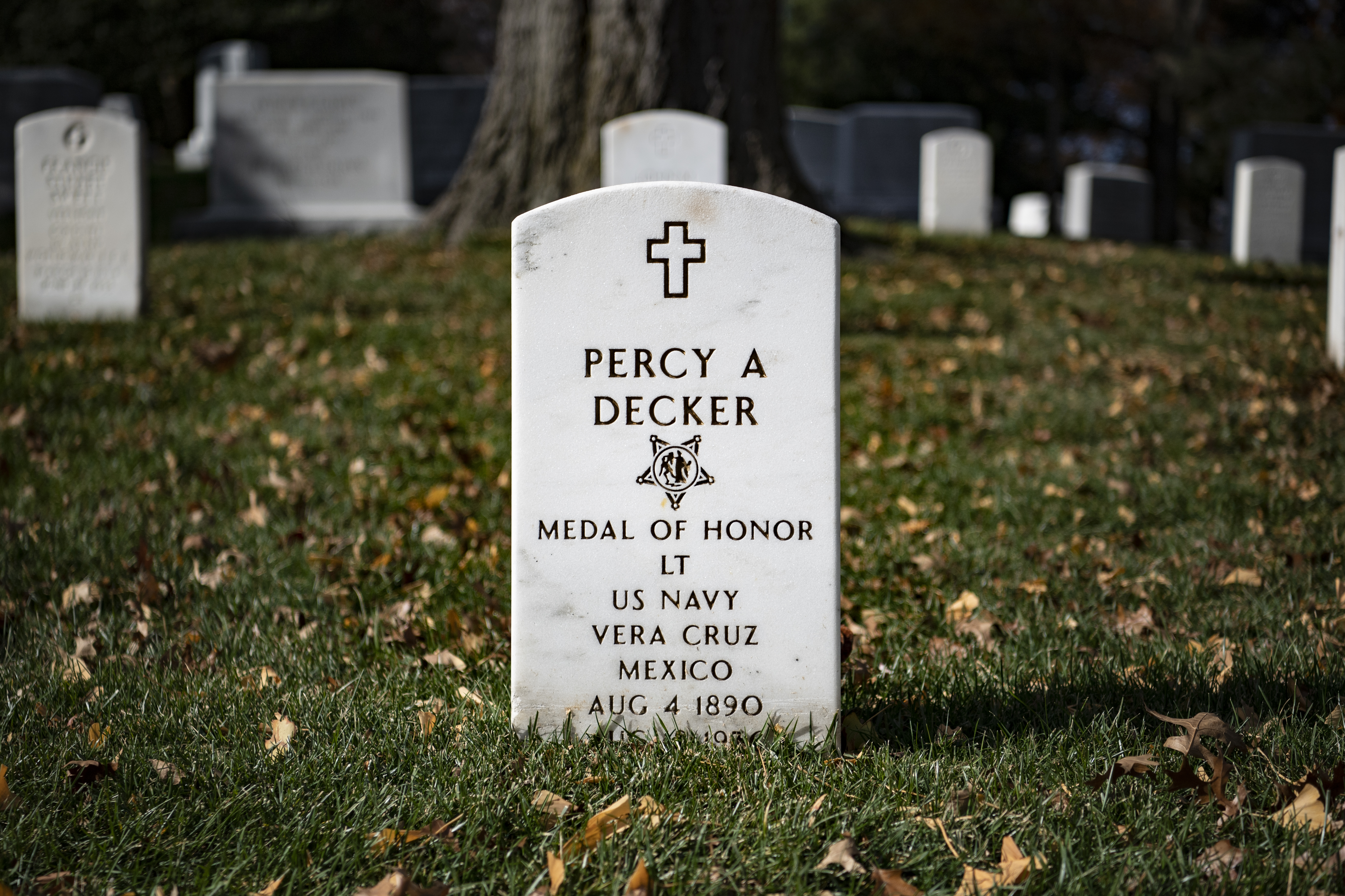
- Grave at Arlington National Cemetery
- Born: August 4, 1890; New York City, US
- Died: August 18, 1936 (aged 46)
- Burial place: Arlington National Cemetery
- Military career
- Allegiance: United States of America
- Branch: United States Navy
- Rank: Lieutenant
- Conflicts: United States occupation of Veracruz; World War I
- Awards: Medal of Honor

Percy Austin Decker (August 4, 1890 – August 18, 1936) was a Boatswain's Mate, Second Class in the United States Navy and a Medal of Honor recipient for his role in the United States occupation of Veracruz.

Decker was promoted to the rank of ensign on August 15, 1918, and to lieutenant on March 3, 1922.

He died while on active duty on August 18, 1936, and is buried in Arlington National Cemetery, Arlington, Virginia.

== Medal of Honor citation ==
Rank and organization: Boatswain's Mate Second Class, U.S. Navy. Born: August 4, 1890, New York, N.Y. Accredited to: New York. G.O. No.: 101, 15 June 1914.

Citation:

On board the U.S.S. Florida during the seizure of Vera Cruz, Mexico, 21 April 1914; for extraordinary heroism in the line of his profession during the seizure of Vera Cruz, Mexico.

== See also ==
- List of Medal of Honor recipients (Veracruz)
