= George Croghan Reid =

US Marine Corps general and Medal of Honor recipient (1876–1961)

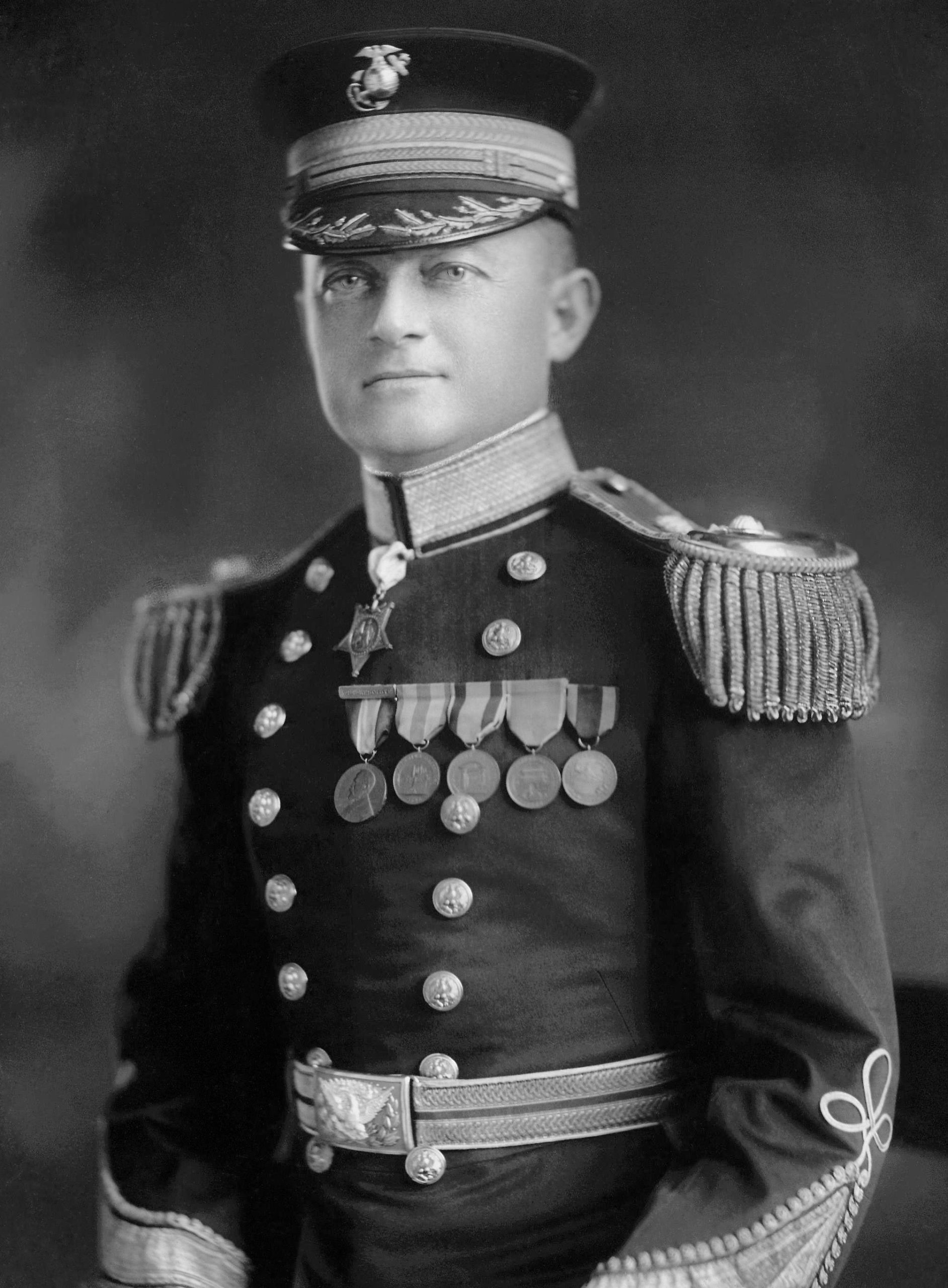
- LtCol George Croghan Reid, 1925
- Born: December 9, 1876; Lorain, Ohio, U.S.
- Died: February 19, 1961 (aged 84); U.S. Air Force Hospital, Harlingen Air Force Base, Texas, U.S.
- Burial place: Arlington National Cemetery, Arlington, Virginia
- Military career
- Allegiance: United States of America
- Branch: United States Marine Corps
- Service years: 1898–1930
- Rank: Brigadier general
- Conflicts: Spanish–American War; United States occupation of Veracruz; World War I
- Awards: Medal of Honor

George Croghan Reid (December 9, 1876 – February 19, 1961) was a brigadier general in the United States Marine Corps and a Medal of Honor recipient for his role in the United States occupation of Veracruz.

== Biography ==
Reid was born in Lorain, Ohio, the son of Conrad Cornelius Reid and his wife Helen Charlotte Crandall. George was named after his father's brother George Croghan Reid, a Marine Corps veteran of the American Civil War.

He was commissioned a second lieutenant in the United States Marine Corps on May 20, 1898. His early assignments included duty with the China Relief Expedition and in the Philippines. In 1912 he was sent to Nicaragua during the insurrection in that country. He took part in the assault and capture of Coyotepe and Barranca on November 19, 1912, for which he received a letter of commendation for gallantry and conspicuous service in action.

In April 1914 he took part in the occupation of Vera Cruz, Mexico and was awarded the Medal of Honor for gallantry in action.

From 1919 to 1921 he was assigned to the Dominican Republic and commanded the Dominican National Guard. In 1921 to 1922 he attended the Naval War College in Newport, Rhode Island, and then served as commander of the Marine barracks at the Brooklyn Navy Yard from 1922 to 1924. He then attended the Army War College, then at Washington Barracks (now Fort McNair) in the District of Columbia, and graduated in 1925.

His last overseas assignment was in command of Marines at Guam. His last posting was officer in charge, USMC Recruiting Division, Chicago. He retired from the Marine Corps September 1, 1930, and was advanced to the rank of brigadier general from the retired list in February 1942 in recognition of having been commended for heroism in combat.

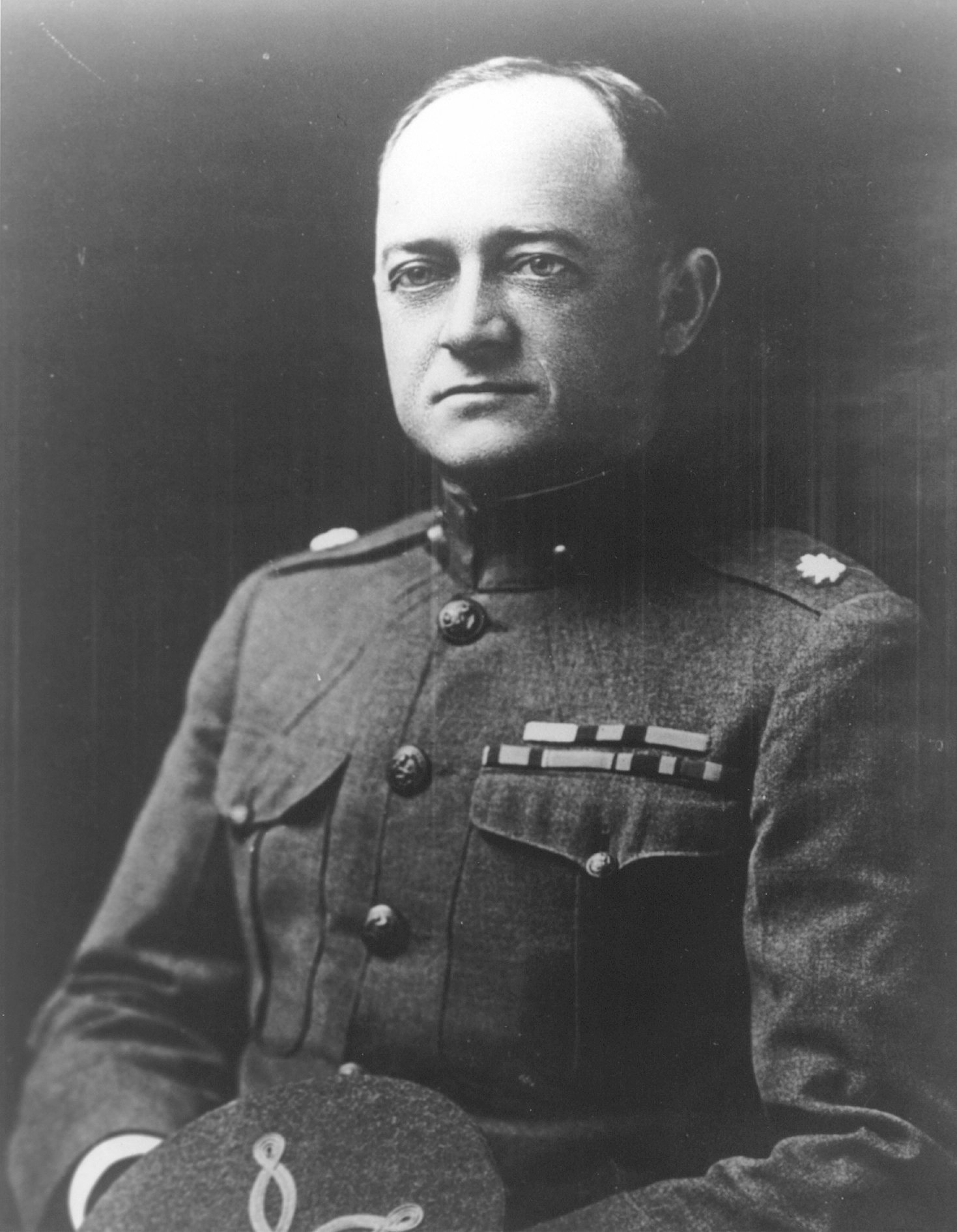

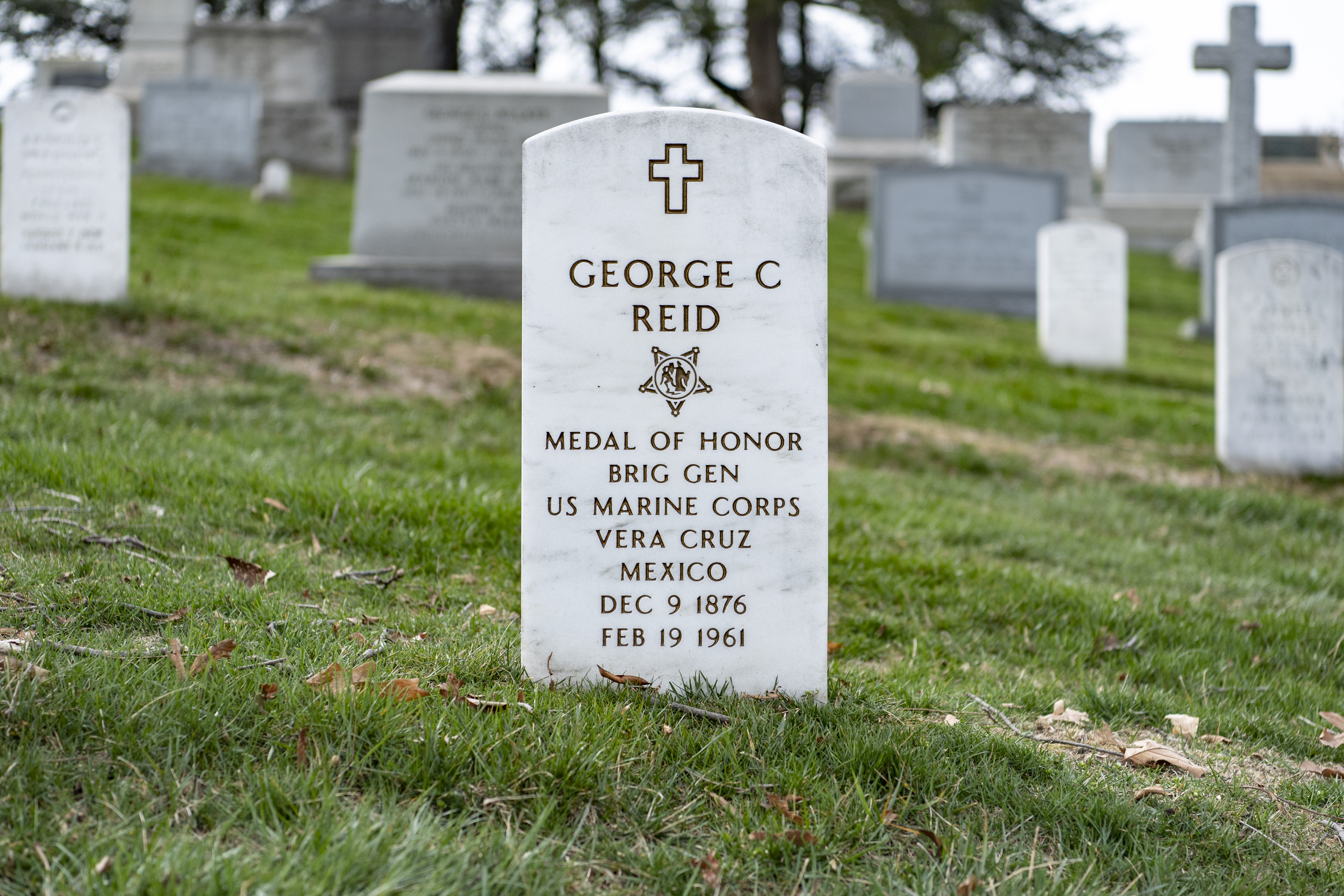
Grave at Arlington National Cemetery

He died February 19, 1961, at the U.S. Air Force hospital, Harlingen Air Force Base, Texas. Reid and his wife Mary Calhoun (1878–1960) are buried in Arlington National Cemetery, Arlington, Virginia.

He was a hereditary member of the District of Columbia Commandery of the Military Order of the Loyal Legion of the United States (MOLLUS).

== Family ==
Reid's parents were Conrad Cornelius Reid, a mariner on the Great Lakes and son of Conrad Reid and Abigail Murdock, and his wife Helen Charlotte Crandall. He is often mistakenly identified as the son of George Croghan Reid, for whom he was named, but the elder Reid, who died in 1914, was actually Conrad Cornelius Reid's brother. The younger Reid was a pallbearer at his uncle's funeral in 1914. The elder Reid was commissioned a second lieutenant in the Marine Corps in July 1864 and rose through the ranks to colonel in March 1899. He was later promoted to brigadier general. He was a veteran companion of MOLLUS. It is interesting that both the elder and younger George Croghan Reids were in the Marine Corps and both attained the rank of Brigadier General.

== Medal of Honor citation ==
Rank and organization: Major, U.S. Marine Corps. Born: 9 December 1876, Lorain, Ohio. Appointed from: Ohio. G.O. No.: 177, 4 December 1915.

Citation:

For distinguished conduct in battle, engagements of Vera Cruz, 21 and 22 April 1914; was eminent and conspicuous in command of his battalion; was in the fighting on both days and exhibited courage and skill in leading his men through action. His cool judgment and courage and his skill in handling his men in encountering and overcoming the machinegun and rifle fire down Cinco de Mayo and parallel streets account for the small percentage of the losses of marines under his command.

== Awards ==

Medal of Honor	Spanish Campaign Medal	China Relief Expedition Medal	Philippine Campaign Medal
Nicaraguan Campaign Medal	Mexican Service Medal	World War I Victory Medal	Dominican Campaign Medal

== See also ==
- List of Medal of Honor recipients (Veracruz)
