= Robert Semple (Medal of Honor) =

- Born: August 18, 1887; Pittsburgh, Pennsylvania, US
- Died: May 13, 1943 (aged 55); San Diego, California, US
- Burial place: Fort Rosecrans National Cemetery, San Diego, California
- Military career
- Allegiance: United States of America
- Branch: United States Navy
- Service years: 1906–1937, 1941–1943
- Rank: Lieutenant Commander
- Unit: USS Florida (BB-30)
- Conflicts: U.S. occupation of Veracruz, 1914; World War I
- Awards: Medal of Honor; Navy Cross

Robert Semple (August 18, 1887 – May 13, 1943) was born in Pittsburgh and became famous as the Chief Gunner in the United States Navy stationed aboard the USS Florida (BB-30).

Semple achieved the rank of lieutenant commander. He received the Medal of Honor for his service during the Vera Cruz campaign. He also received the Navy Cross for his service in the North Sea minefields during World War I. After retiring in 1937, he was recalled at the start of World War II, and died while on active duty.

Semple is buried at Fort Rosecrans National Cemetery, San Diego, California.

== Medal of Honor citation ==
Rank and organization: Chief Gunner, U.S. Navy. Born: 18 August 1887, Pittsburgh, Pa. Accredited to: Pennsylvania. G.O. No.: 120, 10 January 1924. Other Navy award: Navy Cross.

Citation:

For meritorious service under fire on the occasion of the landing of the American naval forces at Vera Cruz on 21 April 1914. C.G. Semple was then attached to the U.S.S. Florida as a chief turret captain.

== See also ==
- List of Medal of Honor recipients
- List of Medal of Honor recipients (Veracruz)
