= Henry Nehemiah Nickerson =

- Born: December 2, 1888; Edgewood, West Virginia, US
- Died: May 2, 1979 (aged 90)
- Burial place: Greenwood Cemetery, Wheeling, West Virginia, US
- Military career
- Allegiance: United States
- Branch: United States Navy
- Service years: 1907 - 1915
- Rank: Boatswain's Mate First Class
- Unit: USS Utah
- Conflicts: United States occupation of Veracruz
- Awards: Medal of Honor

Henry Nehemiah Nickerson (December 2, 1888 – May 2, 1979) was a Boatswain's Mate Second Class in the United States Navy and a Medal of Honor recipient for his role in the United States occupation of Veracruz.

He died May 2, 1979, and is buried in Greenwood Cemetery, Wheeling, West Virginia. His grave can be found in section G, lot 179.

== Medal of Honor citation ==
Rank and organization: Boatswain's Mate Second Class, U.S. Navy U.S.S. Utah. Place and date: Vera Cruz, Mexico, 21 April 1914. Entered service at: West Virginia. Birth: Edgewood, W. Va.

Citation:

On board the U.S.S. Utah, Nickerson showed extraordinary heroism in the line of his profession during the seizure of Vera Cruz, Mexico, 21 April 1914.

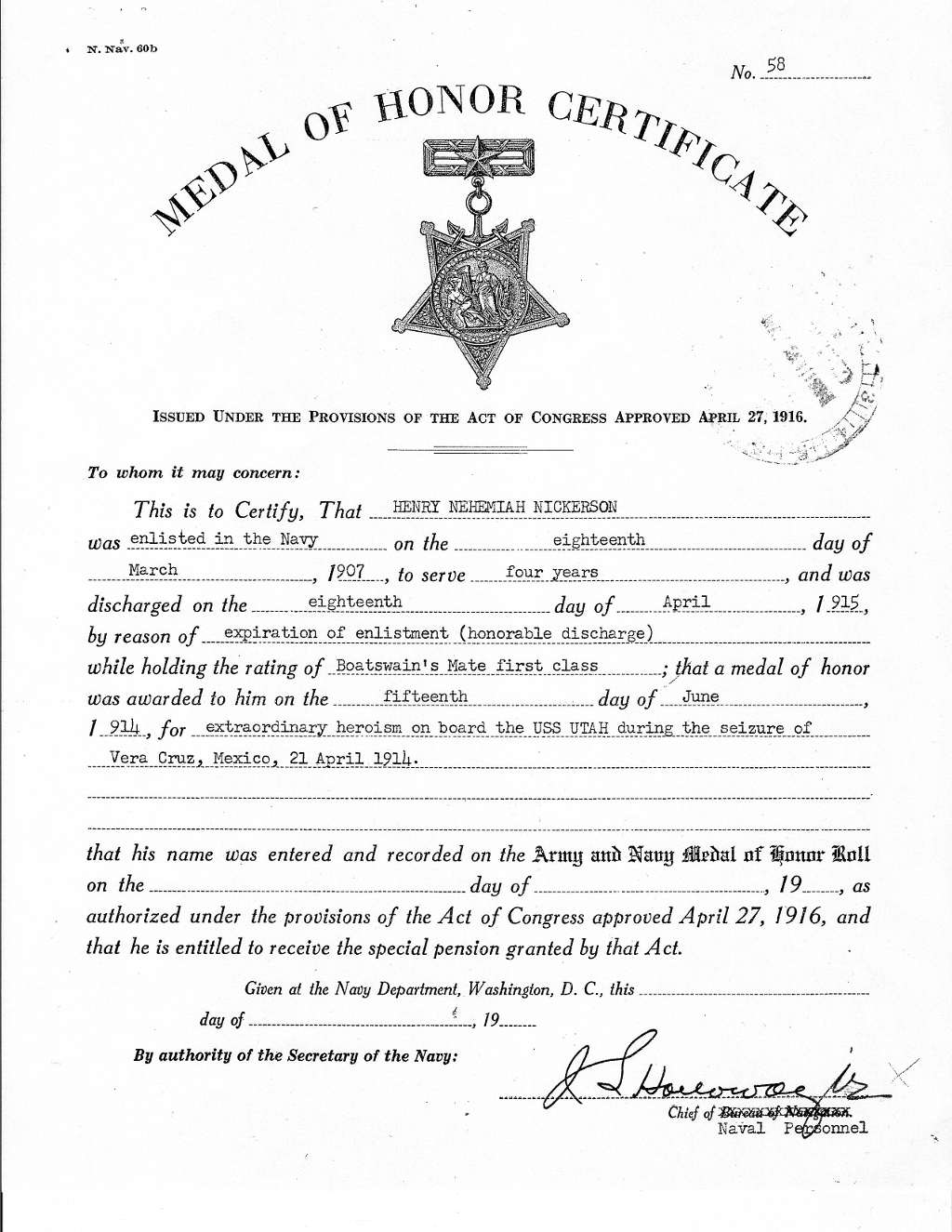
Medal Of Honor Certificate

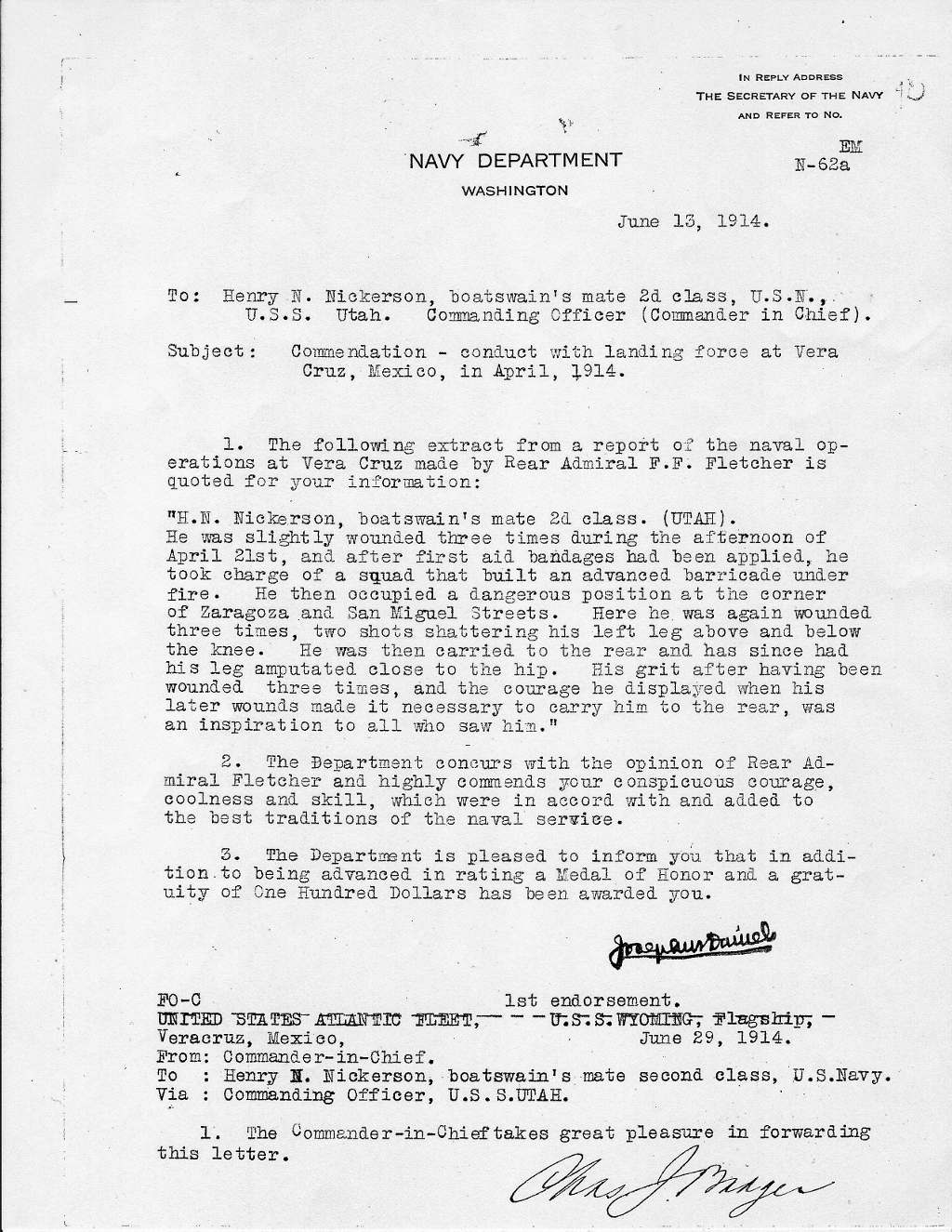
Commendation Letter

The commendatory letter, dated June 13, 1914 reads:

1. The following extract from a report of the naval operations at Vera Cruz made by Rear Admiral F.F. Fletcher is quoted for your information:
  "H.N. Nickerson, boatswain's mate 2d class. (UTAH). He was slightly wounded three times during the afternoon of April 21st, and after first aid bandages had been applied, he took charge of a squad that built an advanced barricade under fire. He then occupied a dangerous position at the corner of Zaragoza and San Miguel Streets. Here he was again wounded three times, two shots shattering his left leg above and below the knee. He was then carried to the rear and has since had his leg amputated close to the hip. His grit after having been wounded three times, and the courage he displayed when his later wounds made it necessary to carry him to the rear, was an inspiration all who saw him."
2. The Department concurs with the opinion of Rear Admiral Fletcher and highly commends your conspicuous courage, coolness and skill, which were in accord with and added to the best traditions of the naval service.
3. The Department is pleased to inform you that in addition to being advanced in rating a Medal of Honor and a gratuity of One Hundred Dollars has been awarded to you.

== See also ==
- List of Medal of Honor recipients (Veracruz)
