= John Arthur Hughes =

US Marine Corps officer and Medal of Honor recipient (1880–1942)

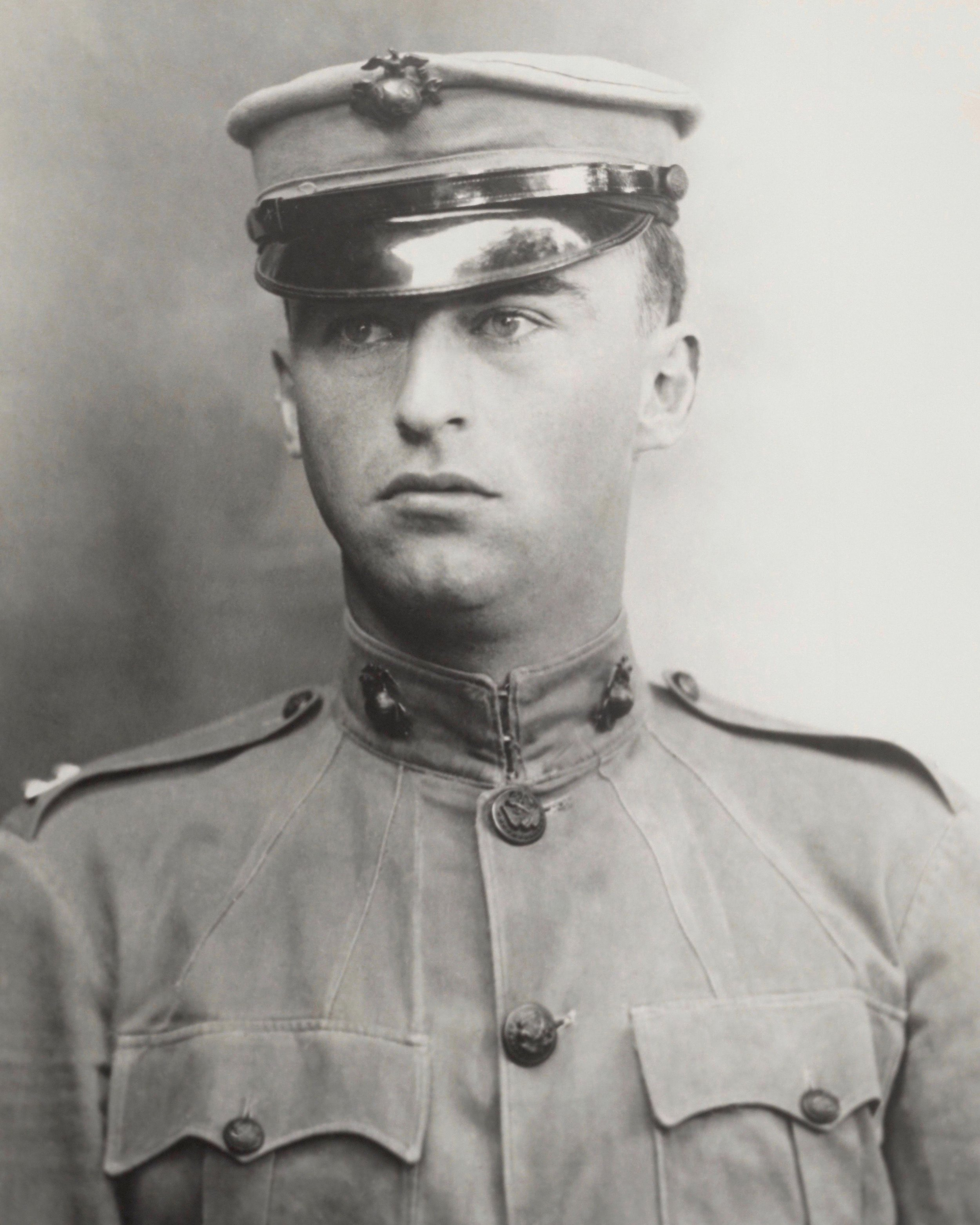
- Hughes as a captain, c. 1915
- Born: November 2, 1880; New York City, U.S.
- Died: May 25, 1942 (aged 61); St. Petersburg, Florida, U.S.
- Burial place: Arlington National Cemetery, Arlington, Virginia
- Military career
- Allegiance: United States of America
- Branch: United States Marine Corps
- Service years: 1900–1919
- Rank: Colonel
- Conflicts: Occupation of Veracruz; World War I
- Awards: Medal of Honor; Navy Cross; Croix de Guerre with Palm; Purple Heart Medal

John Arthur Hughes (November 2, 1880 – May 25, 1942) was an officer in the United States Marine Corps and a Medal of Honor recipient for his role in the United States occupation of Veracruz.

Hughes joined the Marine Corps in March 1900 and was commissioned as an officer in December 1901. As a result of a gas attack during the Battle of Saint-Mihiel, he was medically retired with the rank of lieutenant colonel in July 1919.

Hughes died on May 25, 1942, and is buried at Arlington National Cemetery, Arlington, Virginia.

== Medal of Honor citation ==
Rank and organization: Captain, U.S. Marine Corps. Born: 2 November 1880, New York, N.Y. Accredited to: New York. G.O. No.: 177, 4 December 1915. Other Navy award: Navy Cross.

Citation:

For distinguished conduct in battle, engagements of Vera Cruz, 21 and 22 April 1914. Capt. Hughes was in both days' fighting at the head of his company, and was eminent and conspicuous in his conduct, leading his men with skill and courage.

== Navy Cross citation ==
Citation:

The Navy Cross is presented to John A. Hughes, Lieutenant Colonel, U.S. Marine Corps, for exceptionally meritorious and distinguished service as Battalion Commander, 1st Battalion, 6th Regiment Marines. In the operations of his battalion at Belleau Woods from the 10th to the 13th of June, 1918, Lieutenant Colonel Hughes showed himself a gallant, courageous and determined commander of men.

== See also ==
- List of Medal of Honor recipients (Veracruz)
