= Attorney General Reid =

Attorney General Reid may refer to:

- George Reid (1845–1918), Attorney General of New South Wales
- George Reid (Victorian politician) (1903–1993), Attorney-General of Victoria
- Robert Reid, 1st Earl Loreburn (1846–1923), attorney general for England and Wales

== See also ==
- Inez Smith Reid (born 1937), corporation counsel of the District of Columbia (predecessor office to the attorney general)
- Attorney General Reed (disambiguation)
- General Reid (disambiguation)
