= Allen Buchanan (Medal of Honor) =

US Navy officer and Medal of Honor recipient (1876–1940)

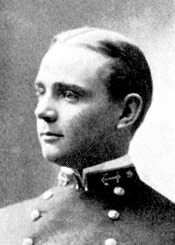
- Allen Buchanan
- Born: December 22, 1876; Evansville, Indiana, U.S.
- Died: January 12, 1940 (aged 63)
- Burial place: Arlington National Cemetery, Arlington, Virginia
- Military career
- Allegiance: United States
- Branch: United States Navy
- Service years: 1899–1932
- Rank: Captain
- Unit: USS Florida
- Conflicts: United States occupation of Veracruz; World War I
- Awards: Medal of Honor; Navy Cross

Allen Buchanan (December 22, 1876 – January 12, 1940) was an officer in the United States Navy and a Medal of Honor recipient for his role in the United States occupation of Veracruz.

== Early life ==
Allen Buchanan was born on December 22, 1876, in Evansville, Indiana. He was appointed to the United States Naval Academy on September 6, 1895.

== Career ==
=== World War I ===
Buchanan served with the destroyer force in World War I in Queenstown, Ireland. He commanded the USS Downes. He received the Navy Cross and the Medal of Honor.

=== Medal of Honor citation ===
Rank and organization: Lieutenant Commander, U.S. Navy. Born: 22 December 1876, Evansville, Ind. Accredited to: Indiana. G.O. No.: 177, 4 December 1915. Other Navy award: Navy Cross.

Citation:

For distinguished conduct in battle, engagements of Vera Cruz, 21 and 22 April 1914. In command of the 1st Seaman Regiment, Lt. Cmdr. Buchanan was in both days' fighting and almost continually under fire from soon after landing, about noon of the 21st, until we were in possession of the city, about noon of the 22d. His duties required him to be at points of great danger in directing his officers and men, and he exhibited conspicuous courage, coolness, and skill in his conduct of the fighting. Upon his courage and skill depended, in great measure, success or Failure. His responsibilities were great, and he met them in a manner worthy of commendation.

=== Navy Cross citation ===
Citation:

The Navy Cross is awarded to Commander Allen Buchanan, U.S. Navy, for distinguished service in the line of his profession as commanding officer of the U.S.S. Downes, engaged in the important, exacting and hazardous duty of patrolling the waters infested with enemy submarines and mines, in escorting and protecting vitally important convoys of troops and supplies through these waters, and in offensive and defensive action, vigorously and unremittingly prosecuted against all forms of enemy naval activity.

=== Later career ===
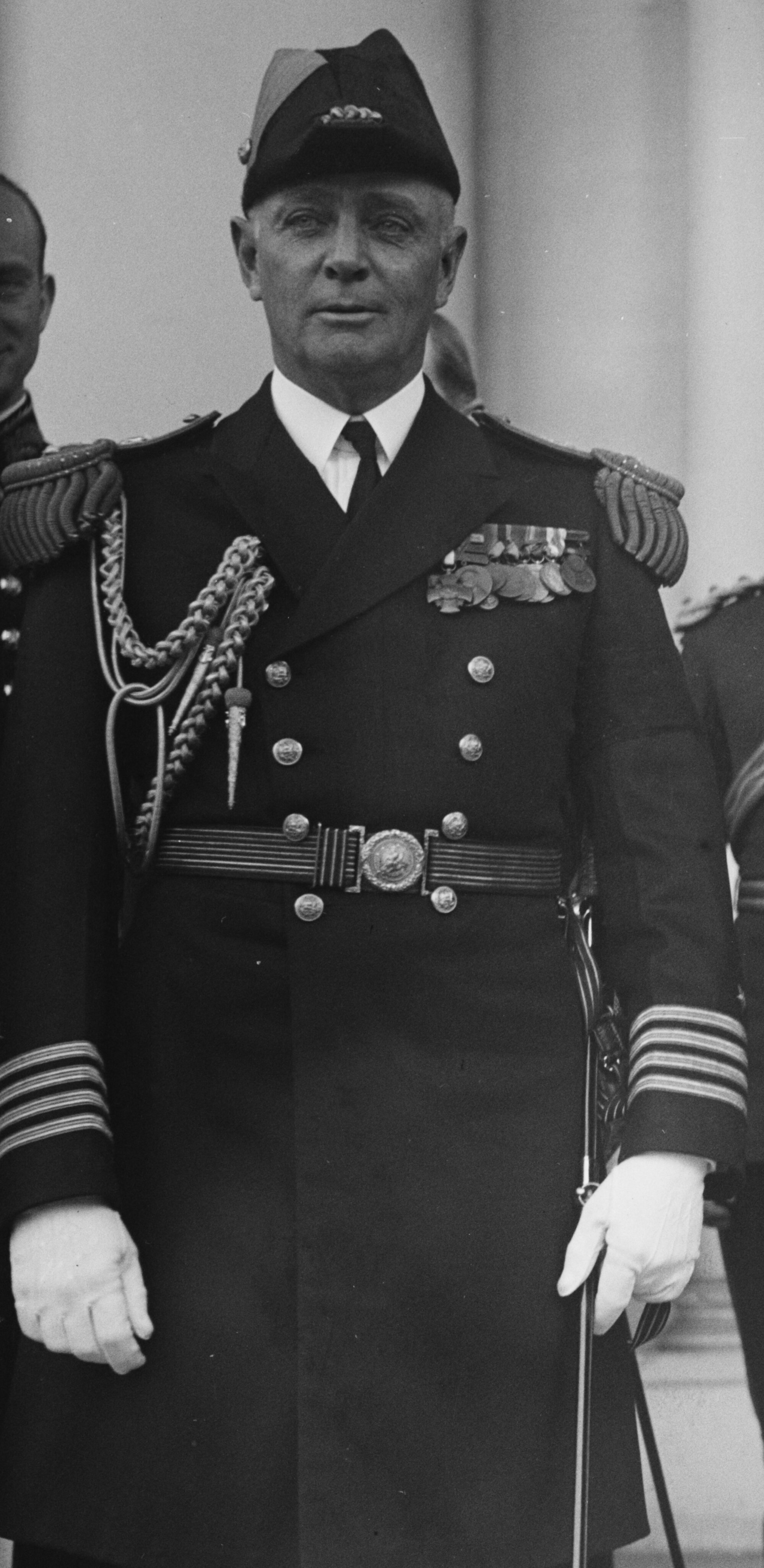
Buchanan as naval aide in 1930

In 1920, Allen was a recruiting inspector in Chicago. He served on the staff of the Naval War College from 1921 to 1923 and then commanded the USS Henderson. He worked in the office of naval operations from 1924 to 1927. He then commanded the USS Omaha. In March 1929, he was appointed as chief naval aide to President Herbert Hoover.

== Personal life ==
Allen died January 12, 1940, and is buried with his wife Mary Goodwin (1876–1952) in Arlington National Cemetery, Arlington, Virginia.

== See also ==
- List of Medal of Honor recipients (Veracruz)
