= John Read (British Army officer) =

British Army officer

Lieutenant-General Sir John Read KCB OBE
- Born: John Hugh Sherlock Read; 6 September 1917
- Died: 5 March 1987; Taunton Deane, Somerset, England
- Military career
- Allegiance: United Kingdom
- Branch: British Army
- Service years: 1937–1975
- Rank: Lieutenant-General
- Unit: Royal Engineers
- Conflicts: Second World War
- Awards: KCB, OBE

Lieutenant-General Sir John Hugh Sherlock Read KCB OBE (6 September 1917 – 5 March 1987) was a senior British Army officer. He served as the Assistant Commandant of the Royal Military Academy Sandhurst, the Director of Military Operations at the Ministry of Defence, the Assistant Chief of the Defence Staff. He was also Director of International Military Staff at NATO Headquarters. Read was knighted by the Queen on 1 January 1972.

== Biography ==
Born on 6 September 1917, was the son of Group Captain John Victor Read and Elizabeth Hannah May (née Link) Read. He was educated at Bedford School, at Magdalene College, Cambridge, and at the Royal Military Academy, Woolwich.

== Career ==
He gained his first commission in the British Army in 1937 when he became a Second Lieutenant in the Royal Engineers. During the Second World War, he served in France, Belgium, Egypt, Palestine, Greece and Austria. Between 1945 and 1957, he served in Austria, Germany, Hong Kong and Singapore.

Read was Assistant Commandant of the Royal Military Academy Sandhurst, between 1966 and 1968, and Director of Military Operations at the Ministry of Defence, between 1968 and 1970. He was Assistant Chief of the Defence Staff at the Ministry of Defence, between 1970 and 1971, and Director of International Military Staff at NATO Headquarters in Brussels, between 1971 and 1975.

Lt. Gen. Sir John Read retired from the British Army in 1975.

== Awards and honours ==
Read was made an Officer of the Order of the British Empire in 1944. Read was made a Knight Commanders of the Order of the Bath (KCB) in the Queen's New Year's Honours of 1972.

== Personal life and death ==
Read married Mary Monica Wulfhilde Curtis in 1941. She predeceased him in 1985. The couple had three children, two sons and a daughter.

Read died in a car accident on 5 March 1987. He was 69.
