= Dominican Campaign Medal =

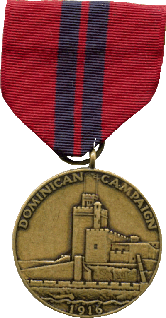
- Obverse
- Type: Campaign medal
- Awarded for: Service in the Dominican Republic
- Presented by: Department of the Navy
- Campaign: Santo Domingo Campaign of 1916
- Established: December 29, 1921
- First award: May 5, 1916
- Final award: December 4, 1916
- ribbon and streamer

The Dominican Campaign Medal is a military decoration of the United States Navy and United States Marine Corps which was created on December 29, 1921. To be awarded the Dominican Campaign Medal, a servicemen must have performed active military duty in the Dominican Republic between May 5 and December 4, 1916.

The medal commemorates the 1916 United States invasion of the Dominican Republic. The medal was designed by Adolph Alexander Weinman, and the design approved by the United States Commission of Fine Arts in November 1923. It was the first Navy and Marine Corps medal whose reverse face contained the inscription "For Service" on a straight line. (All previous reverse faces of Navy and Marine Corps medals had placed the inscription on a curve.)
