= Joseph Gabriel Harner =

US Navy sailor and Medal of Honor recipient

Joseph G. Harner
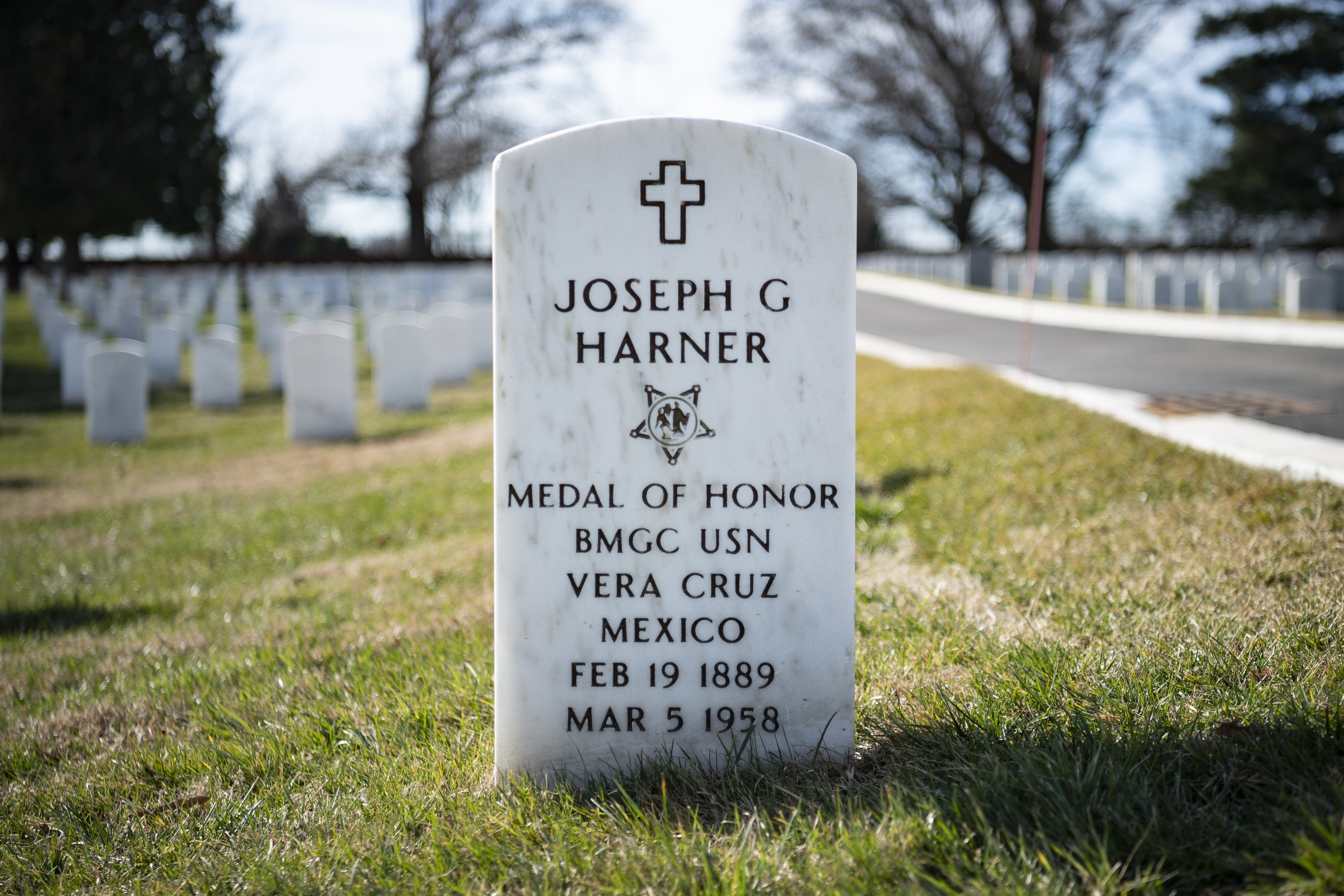
- Grave at Arlington National Cemetery
- Born: February 19, 1889; Louisville, Ohio, US
- Died: March 5, 1958 (aged 69)
- Burial place: Arlington National Cemetery, Arlington, Virginia
- Military career
- Allegiance: United States of America
- Branch: United States Navy
- Service years: 1908–1945
- Rank: Boatswain's Mate Second Class (shipboard) Chief Petty Officer
- Conflicts: United States occupation of Veracruz; World War I World War II
- Awards: Medal of Honor

Joseph Gabriel Harner (February 19, 1889 – March 5, 1958) was a Boatswain's Mate Second Class (shipboard) Chief Petty Officer in the United States Navy and a Medal of Honor recipient for his role in the United States occupation of Veracruz. An excellent marksman, in the heat of the battle he shot Mexican Navy ex cadet and one of the most revered Mexican national heroes, Lt. José Azueta, from about 300 yards away.

Harner retired from the Navy as chief petty officer and died March 5, 1958. He buried at Arlington National Cemetery, Arlington, Virginia.

== Medal of Honor citation ==
Rank and organization: Boatswain's Mate Second Class, U.S. Navy. Born: 19 February 1889, Louisville, Ohio. Accredited to: Ohio. G.O. No.: 101, 15 June 1914.

Citation:

On board the U.S.S. Florida, for extraordinary heroism in the line of his profession during the seizure of Vera Cruz, Mexico, 21 April 1914.

== See also ==
- List of Medal of Honor recipients (Veracruz)
