= George Cregan =

US Navy officer (1886–1969

- Born: December 11, 1886; New York City, US
- Died: June 30, 1969 (aged 82); Manasquan, New Jersey, US
- Burial place: Arlington National Cemetery
- Military career
- Allegiance: United States
- Branch: United States Navy
- Service years: 1907–1947
- Rank: Lieutenant commander
- Unit: USS Florida (BB-30)
- Conflicts: Border War: Battle of Veracruz; World War I World War II
- Awards: Medal of Honor; Navy Cross

George Cregan (December 11, 1885 – June 30, 1969) was a lieutenant commander in the United States Navy. He was a recipient of both the Medal of Honor and the Navy Cross.

== Biography ==
Cregan enlisted in the United States Navy in 1907 and served for 40 years, serving on board over 30 different vessels.

He was a recipient of the Medal of Honor, the nation's highest military award for valor, for his role in the United States occupation of Veracruz when he was a coxswain assigned to the battleship USS Florida.

He received the Navy Cross for his participation in the March 1928 salvage operation of the submarine USS S-4 while commanding officer of the tugboat USS Sagamore.

Cregan was promoted to the warrant officer rank of boatswain on March 15, 1920, chief boatswain on February 20, 1924, and to lieutenant on March 1, 1943. He was promoted to lieutenant commander upon his retirement from the Navy on March 1, 1947.

He died June 30, 1969, and is buried in Arlington National Cemetery, Arlington, Virginia. His grave can be found in section 46, lot 1066.

== Awards ==
- Medal of Honor
- Navy Cross
- Good Conduct Medal
- Mexican Service Medal
- World War I Victory Medal
- American Defense Service Medal
- American Campaign Medal
- World War II Victory Medal

=== Medal of Honor citation ===
Rank and organization: Coxswain, U.S. Navy. Place and date: On board the U.S.S. Florida, at Vera Cruz, Mexico, 21 April 1914. Entered service at: New York. Born: 11 December 1885, New York, N.Y. G.O. No.: 101, 15 June 1914.

Citation:

On board the U.S.S. Florida, for extraordinary heroism in the line of his profession during the seizure of Vera Cruz, Mexico, 21 April 1914. Cregan was ashore when he volunteered for an assault detail under Ens. George Maus Lowry on the Vera Cruz Customhouse under enemy fire both in the alley between the customhouse and warehouse and the assault over objective's walls. During the move up the alley, he tended a wounded comrade, J. F. Schumaker, holding a compress with one hand and firing with the other.

=== Navy Cross citation ===
Rank and organization: Chief Boatswain, U.S. Navy. Action date: December 17, 1927 - March 17, 1928. Company: Submarine and Rescue Salvage Unit. Division: U.S.S. Sagamore.

Citation:

For distinguished service to the Government of the United States in the line of his profession as Commanding Officer of the U.S.S. SAGAMORE throughout the salvage operations of the Submarine S-4, sunk as a result of a collision off Provincetown, Massachusetts, on 17 December 1927. the skillful handling of the SAGAMORE together with the excellent judgment, zeal, efficiency and untiring devotion to duty of her Commanding Officer, was an important factor in the final success of the operations. Chief Boatswain Cregan's actions were in keeping with the highest traditions of the United States Naval Service.

== See also ==
- List of Medal of Honor recipients (Veracruz)
