= Lawrence C. Sinnett =

- Born: April 4, 1888; Burnt House, West Virginia, US
- Died: June 11, 1962 (aged 74)
- Burial place: Odd Fellows cemetery, Harrisville, West Virginia, US
- Military career
- Allegiance: United States
- Branch: United States Navy
- Service years: 1906 - 1926
- Rank: Chief Machinist's Mate
- Unit: U.S.S. Florida
- Conflicts: United States occupation of Veracruz
- Awards: Medal of Honor

Lawrence Clinton Sinnett (April 4, 1888 – June 11, 1962) was a seaman in the United States Navy and a Medal of Honor recipient for his role in the United States occupation of Veracruz.

Sinnett joined the Navy in 1906, and rose to the rank of chief machinists mate before retiring in 1926. He died on June 11, 1962 and is buried in Odd Fellows cemetery, Harrisville, West Virginia.

== Medal of Honor citation ==
Rank and organization: Seaman, U.S. Navy. Born: 4 April 1888, Burnt House, W. Va. Accredited to: Pennsylvania. G.O. No.: 101, 15 June 1914.

Citation:

On board the U.S.S. Florida, Sinnett showed extraordinary heroism in the line of his profession during the seizure of Vera Cruz, Mexico, 21 April 1914.

== See also ==
- List of Medal of Honor recipients
- List of Medal of Honor recipients (Veracruz)
