= William Cronan =

William Cronan may refer to:

- William P. Cronan (1879–1929), Governor of Guam and naval officer
- William S. Cronan (1883–1959), Naval officer and Medal of Honor recipient

== See also ==
- William Cronon (born 1954), academic
