= Frank Ebenezer Hill =

United States Navy Medal of Honor recipient (1880–1932)

- Born: July 31, 1880; LaGrange, Indiana
- Died: September 23, 1932 (aged 52)
- Military career
- Allegiance: United States of America
- Branch: United States Navy
- Rank: Ship's Cook First Class
- Unit: USS Bennington
- Conflicts: Non-combat award
- Awards: Medal of Honor

Frank Ebenezer Hill (July 31, 1880–September 23, 1932) was a United States Navy Ship's Cook First Class received the Medal of Honor for actions on board the USS Bennington (PG-4) off San Diego, California during a boiler explosion which killed 62 enlisted men and one officer.

== Medal of Honor citation ==
Rank and organization: Ship's Cook First Class, U.S. Navy. Born: 31 July 1880, La Grange, Ind. Accredited to: Indiana. G.O. No.: 13, 5 January 1906.

Citation:

On board the U.S.S. Bennington, for extraordinary heroism displayed at the time of the explosion of a boiler of that vessel at San Diego, Calif., 21 July 1905.
