= Donald C. Davis =

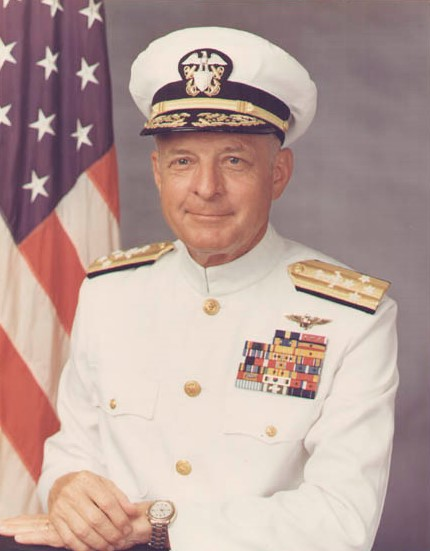
- Born: Donald Cooke Davis; January 24, 1921; New Boston, Missouri, U.S.
- Died: July 30, 1998 (aged 77); La Jolla, California, U.S.
- Burial place: Fort Rosecrans National Cemetery, San Diego, CA
- Children: 1
- Relatives: Elaine Margaret Davis (wife)
- Military career
- Allegiance: United States
- Branch: United States Navy
- Service years: 1943–1981
- Rank: Admiral
- Commands: U.S. Pacific Fleet
- Conflicts: World War II; Korean War; Vietnam War
- Awards: Navy Distinguished Service Medal (2); Legion of Merit (4); Air Medal (2)

Donald Cooke Davis (January 24, 1921 – July 30, 1998) was a Naval Aviator and later an admiral in the United States Navy. He was Commander of the U.S. Pacific Fleet from 1978 to 1981.

== Early life and education ==
Donald Cooke Davis was born on January 24, 1921, in New Boston, Missouri, the son of Randal N. and Alice Isabelle Cooke Davis. He graduated in 1938 from Brookfield High School. Following his high school graduation, he attended the University of Missouri-Columbia while awaiting his appointment to the U.S. Naval Academy. He was admitted to the Academy to graduate in the Class of 1944 but, due to World War II, he graduated on 9 June 1943 with a Bachelor of Science degree in Marine Engineering and was commissioned as an Ensign in the U.S. Navy. In 1960, Davis entered the Naval War College in Newport, Rhode Island. While at Newport, he completed the Senior Course in Naval Warfare.

== Career highlights ==
During World War II, Davis served aboard the USS Mobile in the Pacific Theater, which participated in nine major campaigns. He qualified as a Naval Aviator in May 1946 and then served in several carrier-based fighter squadrons, including VF-51, the Navy's first operational jet squadron.

At the start of the Korean War, Davis' squadron, aboard the USS Leyte, was sent from the Mediterranean to Korea. Here he flew 51 combat missions and was awarded two Air Medals. In 1952, Davis was ordered to Nellis Air Force Base, Las Vegas, Nevada. Here, he helped train Air Force F-86 pilots on lessons learned while flying missions in Korea. Following his assignment with the Air Force, Davis became Commanding Officer of Fighter Squadron Two Hundred Eleven (VF-211) in 1957 and made Western Pacific (WESTPAC) deployments aboard the USS Midway and the USS Bon Homme Richard.

After his WESTPAC tours, Davis reported for duty in Washington, D.C., where he served as Aide and Special Assistant to the Undersecretary of the Navy.

In February 1962, he became Commander of Carrier Air Group Five. While serving as Air Group Commander, he made a South American transit cruise aboard the aircraft carrier USS Constellation.

During the years 1964–66, Davis served as the Senior Navy Project Officer for the F-111 (TFX) aircraft in the Air Force Systems Command. Davis was the first Naval Aviator to fly an F-111. He also received the Legion of Merit in the development of the aircraft.

On 3 June 1966, Davis assumed command of the USS Montrose (APA-212) which recently participated in numerous amphibious operations off the coast of Vietnam. He then commanded the USS Kitty Hawk from 28 August 1967 to 30 September 1968.

In 1969–70, Rear Admiral Davis was Commander, Task Force 130, the Pacific Recovery Forces for the crewed spacecraft missions Apollo 11 and Apollo 13.

In 1974 Rear Admiral "Red Dog" Davis was Commander of Task Force 77 in the US Pacific Fleet.

Davis was a recipient of the Navy Distinguished Service Medal for service as the Director, Navy Program Planning, Office of the Chief of Naval Operations from May 1975 to February 1978.

Subsequently, promoted to Vice Admiral, and later Admiral, Davis was Commander in Chief of the U.S. Pacific Fleet from 1978 to 1981, retiring on 1 August 1981.

=== Role in Apollo 11 success ===
In November 2016, a report re-emerged that credited Davis with being a significant part of the success of Apollo 11. (The story had first emerged in 2004.) Just days before the mission was to launch, Captain Willard S. "Sam" Houston Jr. took command of the Pacific Fleet Weather Centre, Hawaii. He took immediate interest in the mission's splashdown position, and took the initiative to seek out data from the top secret Corona satellite station. Houston was warned by the Corona station commander, Major Hank Branli, that the intended splashdown area would be subject to a gathering storm. Without revealing the Corona source, Houston took this information to the commander of the recovery fleet, Davis, and convinced him of the need to change the recovery site. Davis ordered the fleet to change position, and together they then convinced NASA of the need to change the landing area. The U.S. Navy flew an aircraft over the original site during the landing, and found a major storm which would have been disastrous for Apollo 11.

== After the Navy ==
Davis and his wife, the former Elaine Mcauvic, of Scranton, Pennsylvania, moved to Coronado, California, with their daughter, Aditha. Davis died of a heart attack on July 30, 1998, in La Jolla, California. He was buried at Fort Rosecrans National Cemetery, San Diego, California.

== Awards and decorations ==
His awards include:

Naval Aviator Badge
| Navy Distinguished Service Medal w/ 5/16" Gold star | | Legion of Merit w/ three 5/16" Gold stars |
| Air Medal w/ two 5/16" Gold stars | Navy Presidential Unit Citation w/ 3/16" Bronze star | Navy Unit Commendation |
| China Service Medal | American Defense Service Medal w/ Fleet clasp | American Campaign Medal |
| Asiatic-Pacific Campaign Medal w/ four 3/16" Bronze stars | World War II Victory Medal | Navy Occupation Service Medal w/ 'Japan' clasp |
| National Defense Service Medal w/ 3/16" Bronze star | Korean Service Medal w/ two 3/16" Bronze stars | Armed Forces Expeditionary Medal |
| Vietnam Service Medal w/ two 3/16" Bronze stars | Knight of the National Order of Vietnam | Vietnam Gallantry Cross w/ Palm |
| Republic of Korea Presidential Unit Citation | Philippine Liberation Medal w/ two 3/16" Bronze stars | United Nations Service Medal |
| Vietnam Campaign Medal | Republic of Korea War Service Medal | Navy Rifle Marksmanship Ribbon |
