= William Sidney Shacklette =

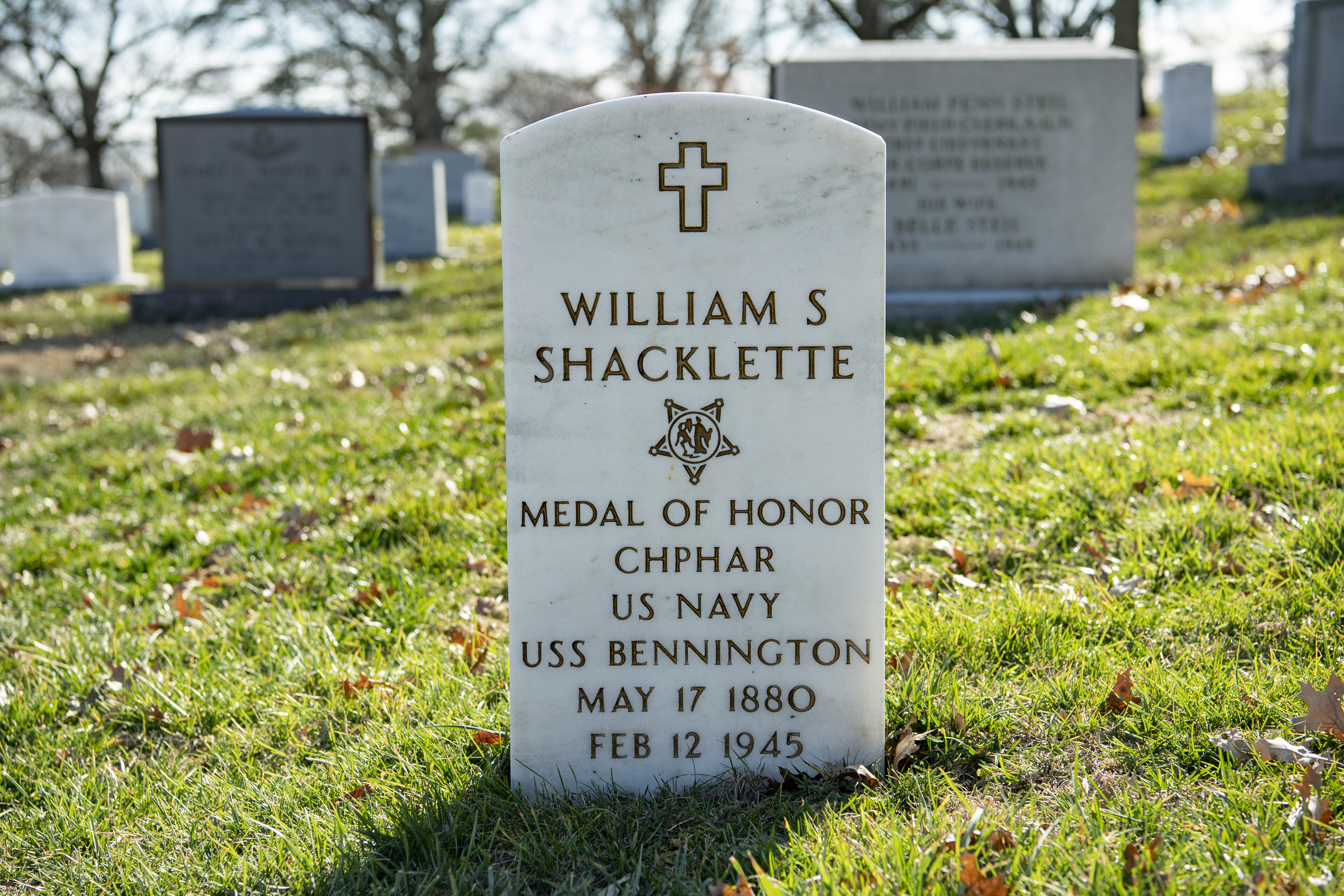
- Grave at Arlington National Cemetery
- Born: May 18, 1880; Delaplane, Virginia
- Died: February 12, 1945 (aged 64)
- Burial place: Arlington National Cemetery Arlington, Virginia
- Military career
- Allegiance: United States of America
- Branch: United States Navy; United States Army
- Rank: Hospital Steward (Navy)
- Unit: USS Bennington (PG-4)
- Awards: Medal of Honor

William Sidney Shacklette (May 18, 1880 - February 12, 1945) was a hospital steward serving in the United States Navy who received the Medal of Honor for bravery.

== Biography ==
Shacklette was born May 18, 1880, in Delaplane, Virginia and when he was twenty-two years old he joined the United States Navy. He enlisted for four years as a Hospital Apprentice First Class at the U.S. Naval Rendezvous at the Washington Navy Yard in Washington, D.C. He served on two other ships before being transferred to the gunboat USS Bennington (PG-4). He was stationed aboard the USS Bennington as a hospital steward when on July 21, 1905, one of the USS Bennington's boilers exploded while it was in San Diego, California. Although he suffered severe third degree burns over much of his body in the explosion he assisted other wounded as much as he could and was credited with saving the lives of many of his fellow sailors. For his actions received the Medal January 5, 1906. Due to his injuries he was honorably discharged from the Navy from the sailors quarters at the Washington Navy Yard October 23, 1906.

After recovering from his wounds he completed seminary school and returned to active duty in the United States Army during World War I as a chaplain. He remained on active duty through the war and once it was over continued as a minister which eventually led to his nomination to be the Chaplain of the United States Senate.

He died February 12, 1945, and was buried in Arlington National Cemetery Arlington, Virginia seven days later on February 19, 1945. His grave can be found in section 10, lot 10688.

== Honors ==
Shacklette Hall, a barracks located at Portsmouth Naval Medical Center was named for him on June 13, 1996.

== Medal of Honor citation ==
Rank and organization: Hospital Steward, U.S. Navy. Born: 17 May 1880, Delaplane, Va. Accredited to: Virginia. G.O. No.: 13, 5 January 1906.

Citation:

For extraordinary heroism while serving on the U.S.S. Bennington at the time of the explosion of a boiler of that vessel at San Diego, Calif., 21 July 1905.

== See also ==
- List of Medal of Honor recipients in non-combat incidents
