= Oscar Frederick Nelson =

American decorated soldier

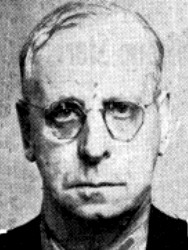
- Born: November 5, 1881; Minneapolis, Minnesota, US
- Died: September 26, 1951 (aged 69)
- Burial place: Fort Snelling National Cemetery, Minneapolis, Minnesota
- Military career
- Allegiance: United States
- Branch: United States Navy
- Rank: Chief Machinist's Mate
- Unit: USS Bennington (PG-4)
- Awards: Medal of Honor

Oscar Frederick Nelson (November 5, 1881 – September 26, 1951) was a machinist's mate first class serving in the United States Navy who received the Medal of Honor for bravery.

== Biography ==
Nelson was born November 5, 1881, in Minneapolis, Minnesota and after joining the navy was stationed aboard the USS Bennington (PG-4) as a machinist's mate first class. On July 21, 1905, the USS Bennington was in San Diego, California when a boiler exploded. For his actions he received the Medal January 5, 1906.

He was married to Anna D. Nelson. He died September 26, 1951, and is buried in Fort Snelling National Cemetery in Minneapolis, Minnesota.

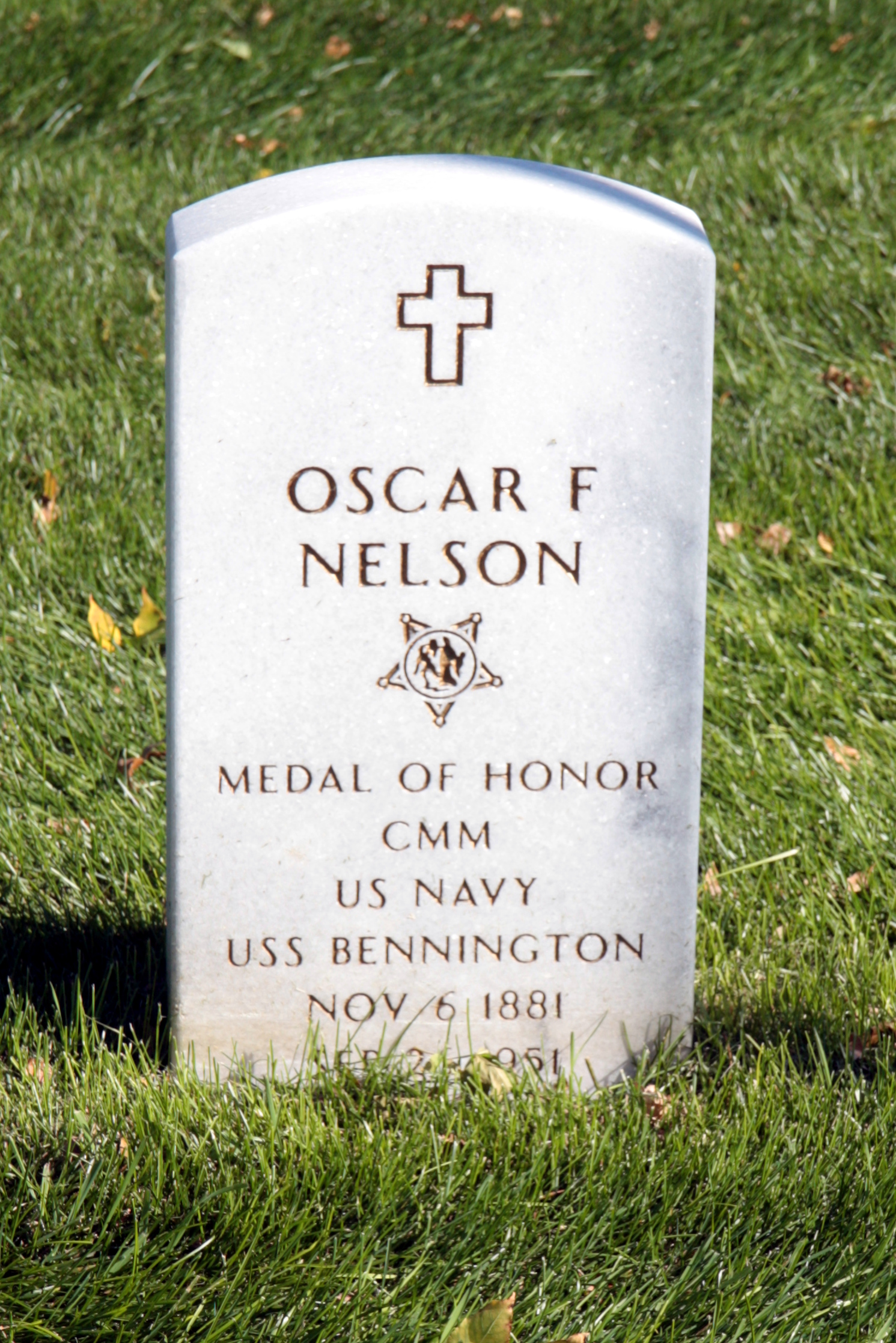
Oscar F Nelson headstone in Fort Snelling National Cemetery

== Medal of Honor citation ==
Rank and organization: Machinist's Mate First Class, U.S. Navy. Born: 5 November 1881, Minneapolis, Minn. Accredited to: Minnesota. G.O. No.: 13, 5 January 1906.

Citation:

Serving on board the U.S.S. Bennington, for extraordinary heroism displayed at the time of the explosion of a boiler of that vessel at San Diego, Calif., 21 July 1905.

== See also ==
- List of Medal of Honor recipients during peacetime
