= Edward William Boers =

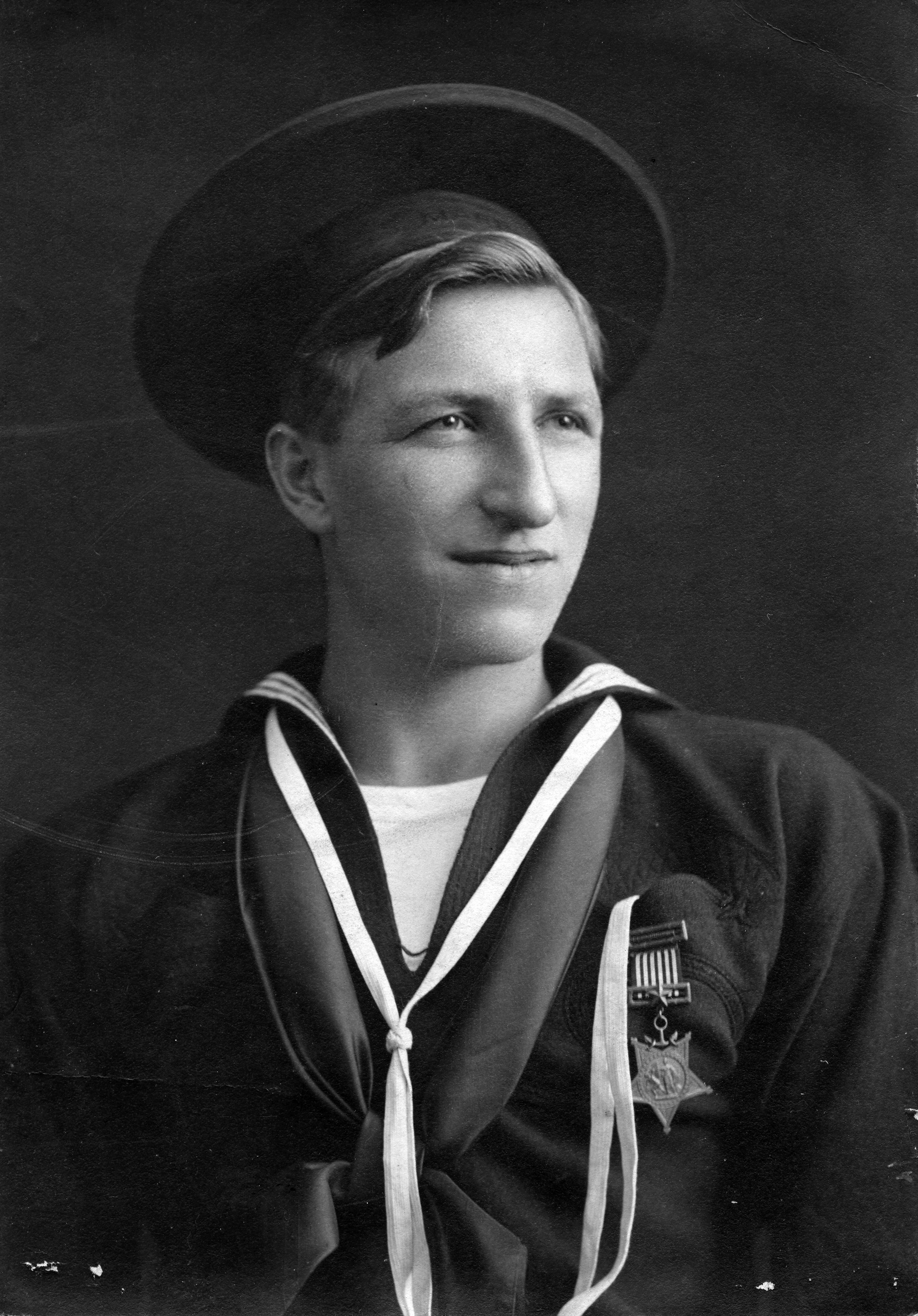
- Medal of Honor recipient
- Born: March 10, 1884; Cincinnati, Ohio, U.S.
- Died: April 2, 1929 (aged 45); Cincinnati, Ohio, U.S.
- Military career
- Allegiance: United States
- Branch: United States Navy
- Rank: Seaman
- Unit: USS Bennington (PG-4)
- Awards: Medal of Honor

Edward William Boers (March 10, 1884 – April 2, 1929) was a seaman serving in the United States Navy who received the Medal of Honor for bravery.

== Biography ==
Boers was born March 10, 1884, in Cincinnati, Ohio and after joining the navy from Kentucky was stationed aboard the USS Bennington (PG-4) as a seaman. On July 21, 1905, the USS Bennington was in San Diego, California when a boiler exploded. For his actions received the Medal January 5, 1906.

He died April 2, 1929.

== Medal of Honor citation ==
Rank and organization: Seaman, U.S. Navy. Born: 10 March 1884, Cincinnati, Ohio. Accredited to: Kentucky. G.O. No.: 13, 5 January 1906.

Citation

On board the U.S.S. Bennington, 21 July 1905. Following the explosion of a boiler of that vessel, Boers displayed extraordinary heroism in the resulting action.

== See also ==
- List of Medal of Honor recipients in non-combat incidents
