= Rade Grbitch =

Decorated US Navy sailor (1870–1910)

- Born: December 24, 1870; Austria
- Died: March 5, 1910 (aged 39)
- Burial place: San Francisco National Cemetery
- Military career
- Allegiance: United States
- Branch: United States Navy
- Rank: Seaman
- Unit: USS Bennington (PG-4)
- Awards: Medal of Honor

Rade Grbitch or Rade Grbić (Serbian Cyrillic: Раде Грбић; December 24, 1870 – March 5, 1910) was a United States Navy sailor and a recipient of the United States military's highest decoration, the Medal of Honor.

== Biography ==
Grbitch was born December 24, 1870, in Austria-Hungary and joined the Navy from Ohio. He was Serb from Dalmatia. On July 21, 1905, a boiler exploded aboard the USS Bennington (PG-4) while it was at San Diego, California and sank. During the explosion 66 sailors were killed and almost everyone else on the ship was injured. For his actions during the explosion he received the Medal of Honor January 5, 1906.

He died on March 5, 1910, and is buried in San Francisco National Cemetery.

== Medal of Honor citation ==
Rank and organization: Seaman, U.S. Navy. Born: 24 December 1870, Austria. Accredited to: Illinois. G.O. No.: 13, 5 January 1906.

Citation:

On board the U.S.S. Bennington, for extraordinary heroism displayed at the time of the explosion of a boiler of that vessel at San Diego, Calif., 21 July 1905.

== See also ==
- List of Medal of Honor recipients in non-combat incidents
