= John Henry Turpin =

American sailor (1876–1962)

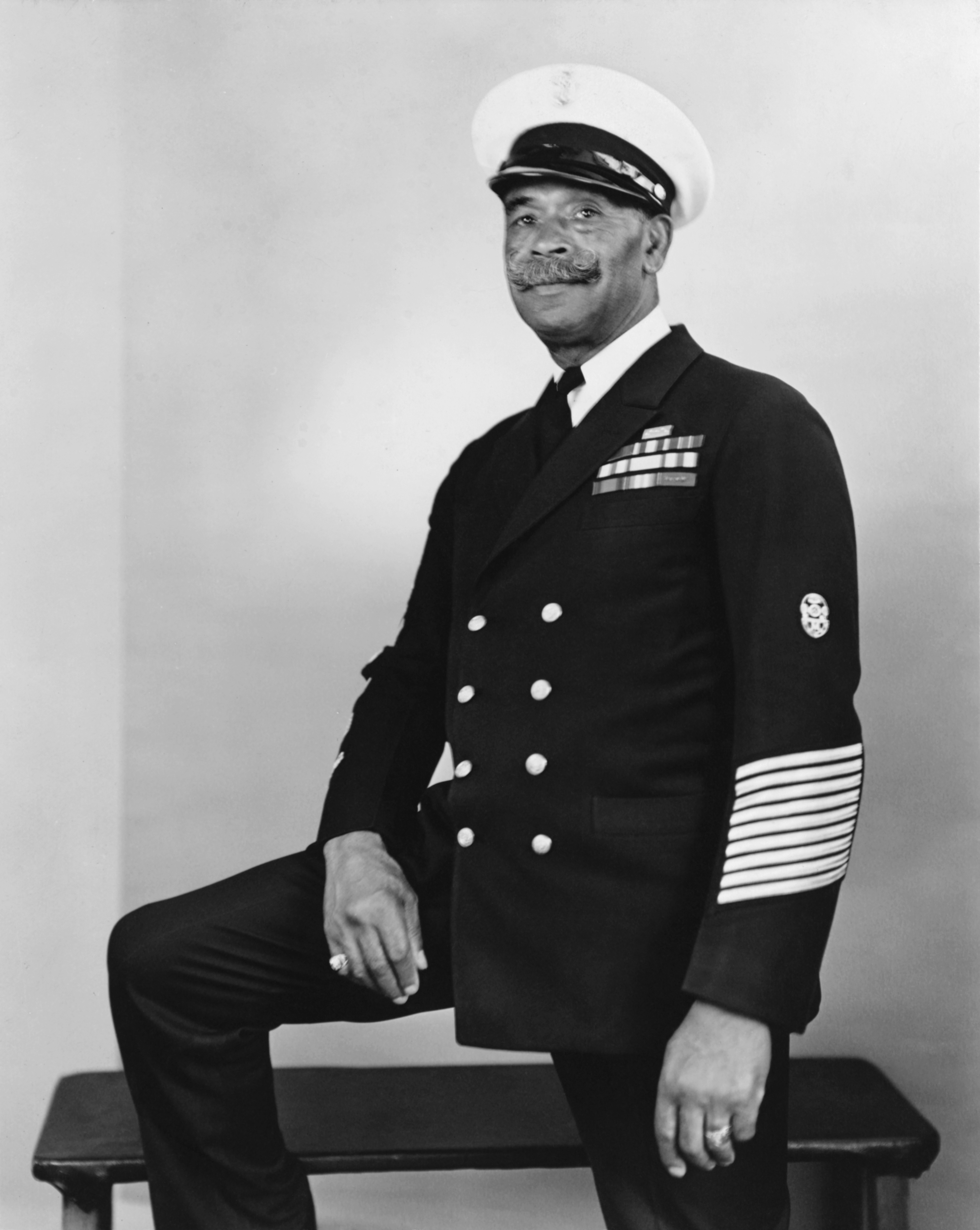
- Turpin in the 1940s
- Born: August 20, 1876; Long Branch, New Jersey, U.S.
- Died: March 10, 1962 (aged 85); Bremerton, Washington, U.S.
- Military career
- Allegiance: United States
- Branch: United States Navy
- Service years: 1896–1925
- Rank: Chief Gunner's Mate, 1917
- Units: USS Maine (ACR-1); USS Bennington (PG-4); USS Marblehead (C-11)
- Conflicts: Spanish–American War; World War I

John Henry Turpin (August 20, 1876 – March 10, 1962) was an American sailor in the United States Navy who survived the catastrophic explosions of two U.S. Navy ships: USS Maine in 1898, and USS Bennington in 1905. Turpin was one of the first African Americans to hold the rank of chief petty officer in the U.S. Navy, becoming a chief gunner's mate on the cruiser Marblehead in 1917. He was transferred to the Fleet Reserve in 1919 and retired in 1925.

== Early life and career ==
Turpin was born on August 20, 1876, in Long Branch, New Jersey, and enlisted in the United States Navy in New York City on November 4, 1896.

He was a mess attendant on the battleship USS Maine (ACR-1) when it exploded in Havana Harbor, Cuba, under mysterious circumstances on the night of February 15, 1898. Turpin was in the pantry of the wardroom when the explosion occurred, and felt the ship "heave and lift" before all went dark. He worked his way aft and climbed out of the wardroom on the captain's ladder and up onto the deck. He dove overboard and was rescued by a motor launch. Turpin was one of 90 out of the 350 officers and men aboard Maine that night to survive the explosion. Turpin saw action in China during the 1900 Boxer Rebellion.

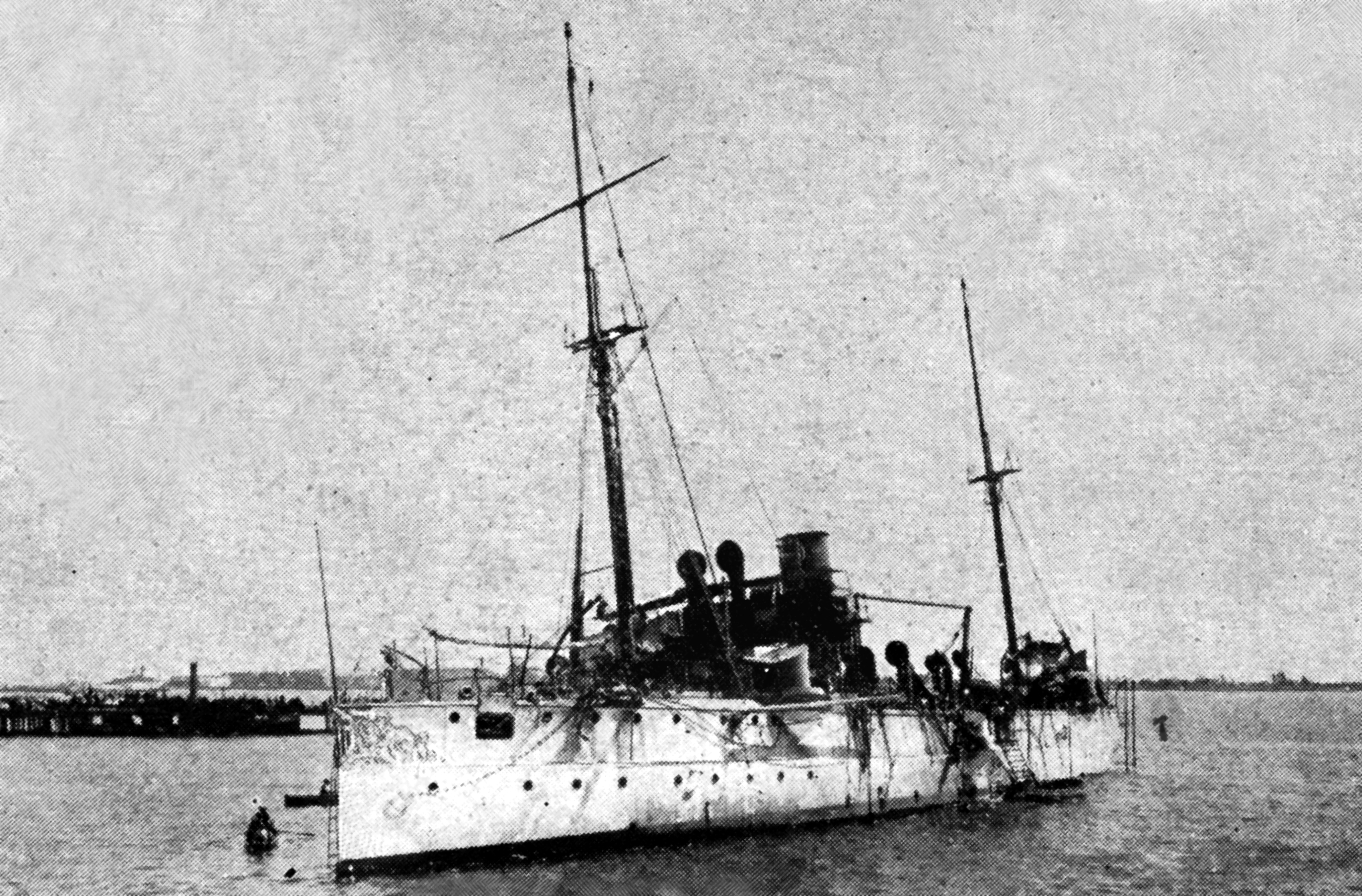
Bennington after the explosion on July 21, 1905, which killed 66

By mid-1905, Turpin had been assigned to the gunboat Bennington. When that ship was raising steam for a departure from San Diego, California, on July 21, 1905, she suffered a boiler explosion that sent men and machinery into the air and killed 66 of the 102 sailors aboard. Turpin reportedly saved three officers and twelve men by swimming them to shore one at a time. Eleven men were awarded the Medal of Honor for "extraordinary heroism displayed at the time of the explosion", but Turpin was not among them. He then moved to the Naval Shipyard at Mare Island, where he utilized his swimming skills and became a diver. By 1915, he was involved with submarines in Hawaii and was recognized as probably the Navy's first Black master diver. According to Naval History and Heritage Command, he helped to successfully raise the sunken ship USS F-4 on 29 August 1915.

Turpin served on several other ships before leaving active duty service in 1916. After the United States entered World War I in April 1917, Turpin was recalled to service. On June 1, 1917, he became a chief gunner's mate on the cruiser Marblehead, which made him among the first African Americans with the rank of chief petty officer in the U.S. Navy. Turpin served at that rank until he was transferred to the Fleet Reserve in March 1919. In October 1925, Turpin retired at the rank of chief gunner's mate. Throughout his career, Turpin was the Navy boxing champion in several different weight classifications and was a boxing instructor at the United States Naval Academy in Annapolis, Maryland.

== Later life and death ==
During World War II, Turpin tried to return to active service but was denied on account of his age. He volunteered to tour Navy training facilities and defense plants to make "inspirational visits" to African American sailors. Turpin died in Bremerton, Washington on March 10, 1962. His ashes were scattered at sea. He was predeceased by his first wife, Anna Turner Turpin. He was survived by his second wife Faye Alice Turpin. In 2017 a memorial for him was placed beside the grave of his first wife at the Ivy Green Cemetery in Bremerton, Washington. The post office in Bremerton was renamed in his honor in 2020.

== Awards ==
- Navy Good Conduct Medal
- Navy Expeditionary Medal
- Spanish Campaign Medal
- Cuban Pacification Medal
- China Campaign Medal
- Philippine Campaign Medal
- Nicaraguan Campaign Medal
- Mexican Service Medal
- World War I Victory Medal

== See also ==
- Carl Brashear
- Donna Tobias, first female diver in the U.S. Navy
