= Otto Diller Schmidt =

Medal of Honor recipient

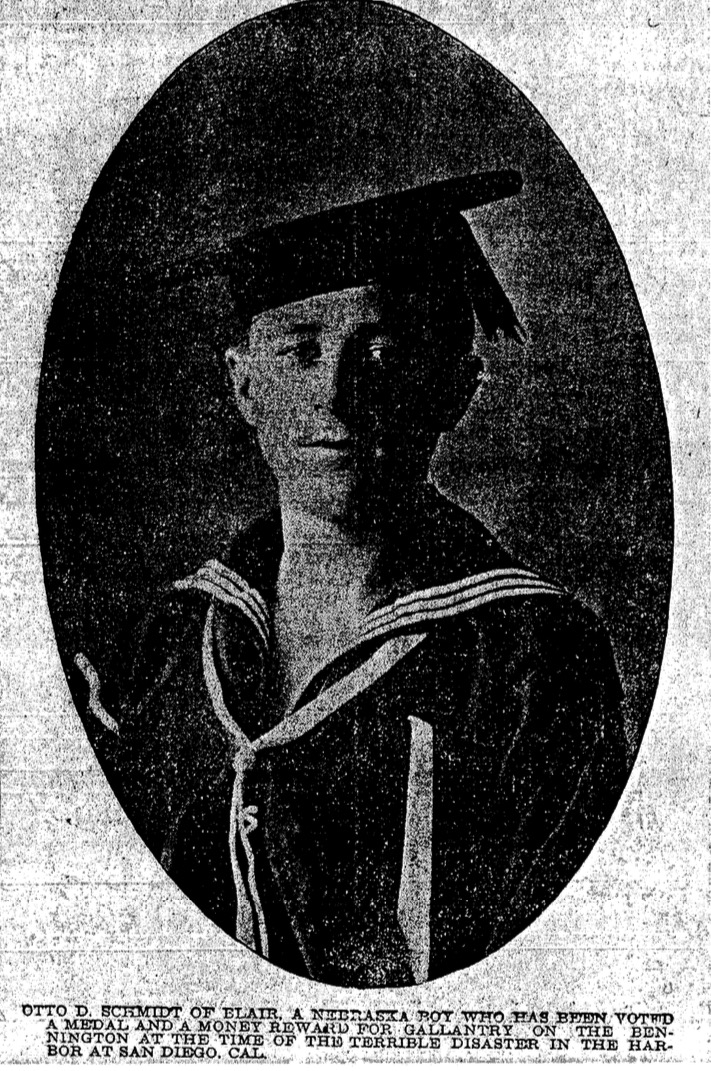
- Born: August 10, 1884; Blair, Nebraska, US
- Died: February 10, 1963 (aged 78); Blair, Nebraska, US
- Burial place: Prospect Hill Cemetery Norfolk, Nebraska, US; 42.04085°N 97.42785°W
- Military career
- Allegiance: United States
- Branch: United States Navy
- Service years: 1901–1906
- Rank: Seaman
- Unit: USS Bennington (PG-4)
- Conflicts: Spanish–American War
- Awards: Medal of Honor

Otto Diller Schmidt (August 10, 1884 – February 10, 1963) was a seaman serving in the United States Navy who received the Medal of Honor for bravery.

== Biography ==
Schmidt was born August 10, 1884, to Detlef and Anna Schmidt in Blair, Nebraska and after joining the navy he was stationed aboard the USS Bennington (PG-4) as a seaman. On July 21, 1905, one of the USS Bennington's boilers exploded while it was in port at San Diego, California. For his actions during and following the explosion he received the Medal January 5, 1906.

After his discharge from the Navy, he returned to Blair, Nebraska and was married to Maud Wilcox. In 1917, he moved to Norfolk, Nebraska and in 1922 got a job as a mail carrier there. In the late 1940s, he retired from his job and moved back to Blair, Nebraska. In 1960, he moved to Crowell Memorial home in Blair, where he died February 10, 1963. He is buried at Prospect Hill Cemetery in Norfolk, Nebraska.

== Legacy ==
Otto Schmidt's Medal Of Honor resides in the custody of the Norfolk Historical Society. In early 2017, Schmidt's Medal Of Honor was put on display in the Washington County Museum, after an effort to return his medal to the county was spearheaded by two Blair high school students, Ben Zimmerman and Spencer Goodwater.

== Medal of Honor citation ==
Rank and organization: Seaman, U.S. Navy. Born: 10 August 1884, Blair, Nebr. Accredited to: Nebraska. G.O. No.: 13, 5 January 1906. Citation:

While serving on board the U.S.S. Bennington for extraordinary heroism displayed at the time of the explosion of a boiler of that vessel at San Diego, Calif., 21 July 1905.

== See also ==
- List of Medal of Honor recipients during peacetime
