= Fort Rosecrans National Cemetery =

Historic veterans cemetery in San Diego, California

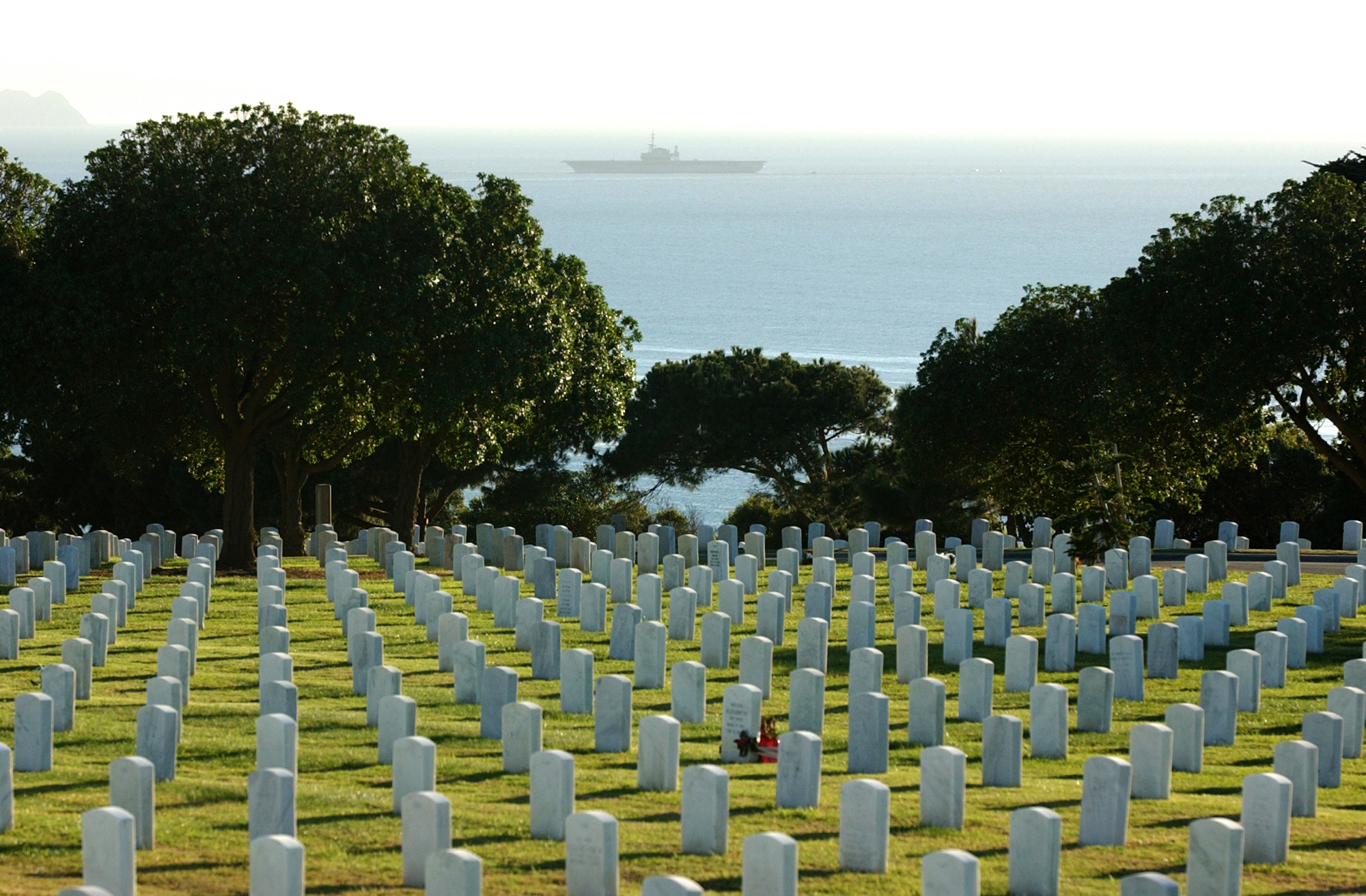
- Fort Rosecrans National Cemetery, with the aircraft carrier USS Midway (CV-41) in the background.
- Interactive map of Fort Rosecrans National Cemetery

Details
- Established: 1882
- Location: Point Loma, San Diego, California
- Country: United States
- Coordinates: 32°41′19″N 117°14′45″W
- Type: United States National Cemetery
- No. of interments: >120,000
- Website: Fort Rosecrans National Cemetery
- Find a Grave: Fort Rosecrans National Cemetery
- Footnotes: Nationwide Gravesite Locator (USDVA)

California Historical Landmark
- Reference no.: 55

San Diego Historic Landmark
- Reference no.: 19

U.S. National Register of Historic Places
- Designated: March 8, 2016
- Reference no.: 16000054

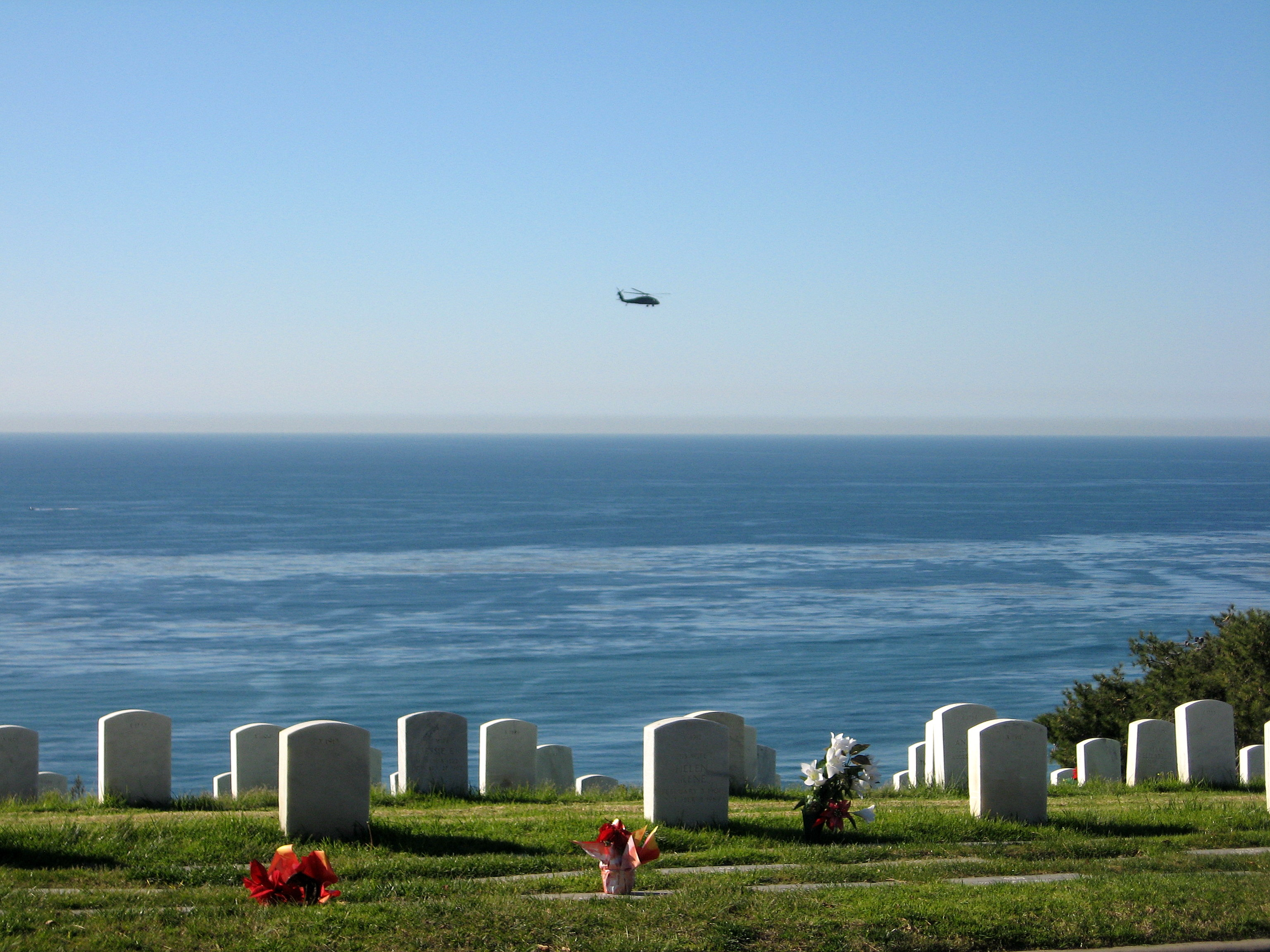
A Seahawk flies past the cemetery.

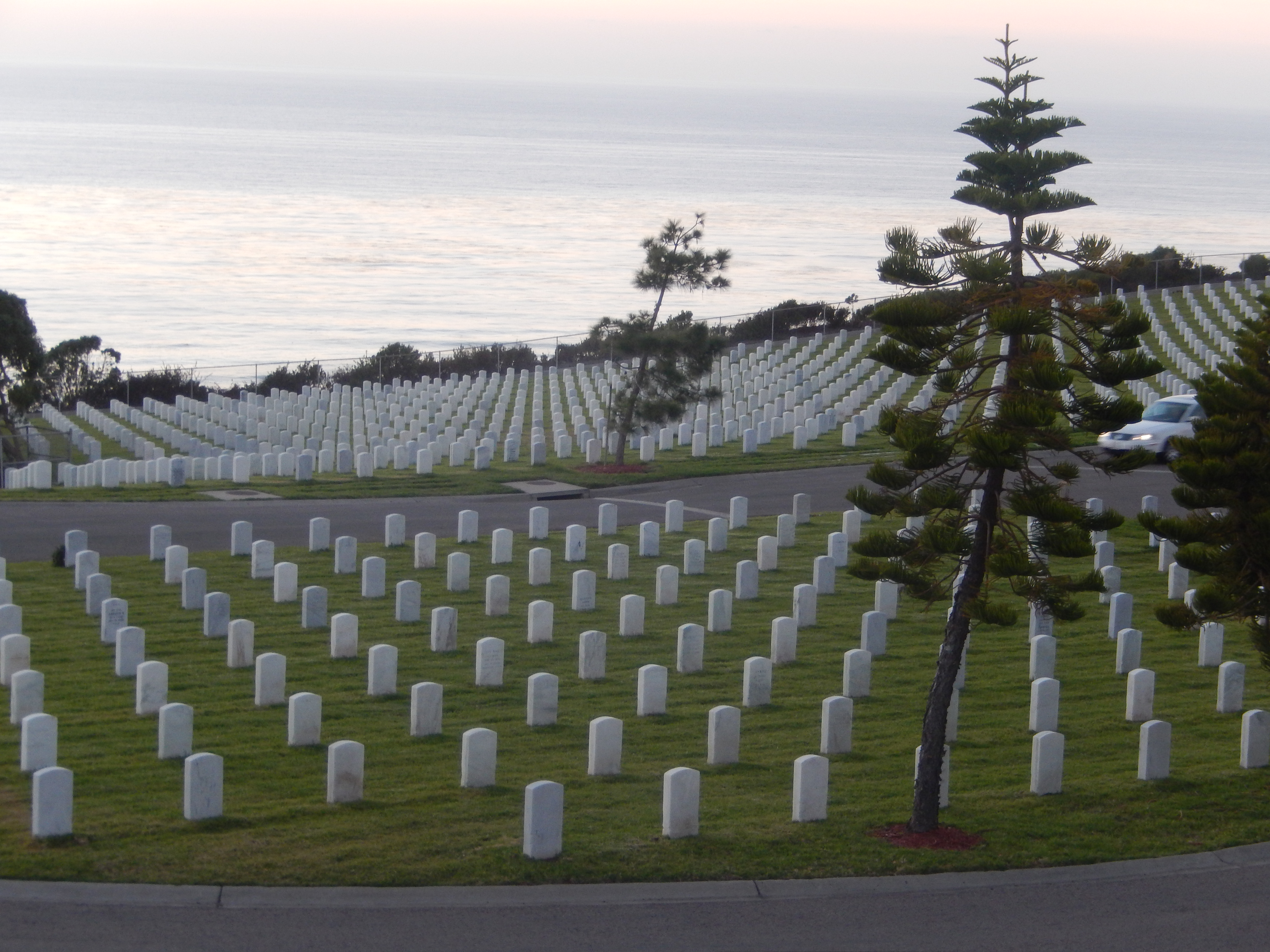

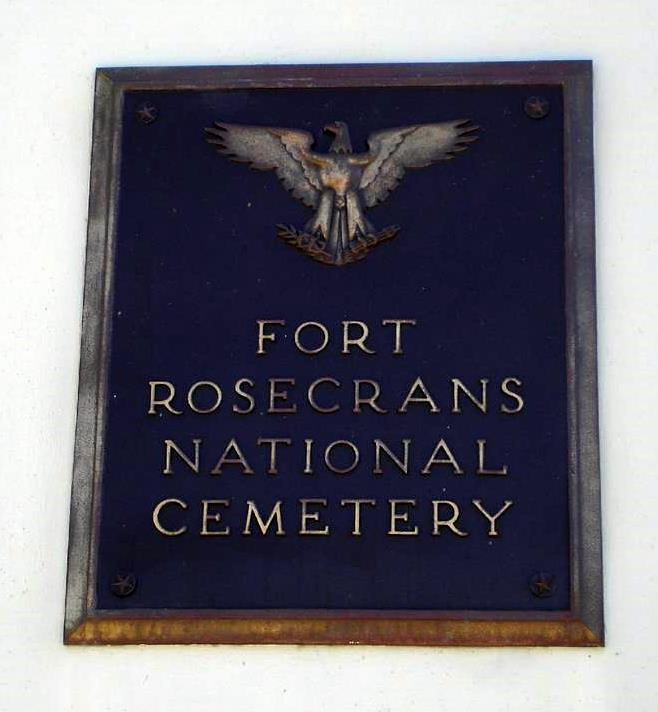

Fort Rosecrans National Cemetery is a federal military cemetery in San Diego, California. It is located on the grounds of the former Army coastal artillery station Fort Rosecrans and is administered by the United States Department of Veterans Affairs. Fort Rosecrans is named after William Starke Rosecrans, a Union general in the American Civil War.

The cemetery is located approximately 10 miles (16 km) west of downtown San Diego, overlooking San Diego Bay and the city from one side, and the Pacific Ocean on the other. The cemetery was registered as California Historical Landmark #55 on December 6, 1932. The cemetery is spread out over 77.5 acres (31.4 ha) located on both sides of Catalina Blvd.

== History ==
Many Fort Rosecrans interments date to the early years of the California Republic, including the remains of the casualties of the Battle of San Pasqual, in which 19 of Brigadier General Stephen W. Kearny's men and an untold number of Californios lost their lives. Initially, the dead were buried where they fell, but by 1874 the remains had been removed to the San Diego Military Reservation. Eight years later, the bodies were again reinterred at what is now Fort Rosecrans National Cemetery. In 1922, the San Diego chapter of the Native Sons and Daughters of the Golden West had a large boulder brought from the battlefield and placed at the gravesite with a plaque affixed that lists the names of the dead.

Another notable monument in Fort Rosecrans National Cemetery is the USS Bennington Monument which commemorates the deaths of 62 sailors in a boiler explosion aboard USS Bennington (PG-4). Bennington, which had just returned from maneuvers in the Pacific, was anchored in San Diego Harbor. On July 21, 1905, the crew was ordered to depart in search for USS Wyoming (BM-10), which had lost a propeller at sea. At approximately 10:30 a.m., an explosion in the boiler room ripped through the ship, killing or wounding the majority of the crew. Two days later the remains of soldiers and sailors were brought to the post cemetery and interred in an area known as Bennington Plot.

At one time, the cemetery was called the Bennington Nation Cemetery, but in 1934 was named the Fort Rosecrans National Cemetery. Fort Rosecrans became a National Cemetery on October 5, 1934. The decision to make the post cemetery part of the national system came, in part, due to changes in legislation that greatly increased the number of persons eligible for burial in a national cemetery. Grave space in San Francisco National Cemetery then grew increasingly limited. In addition, southern California was experiencing a phenomenal population growth during this period, and there was a definitive need for more burial sites.

In 1973, Fort Rosecrans National Cemetery was placed under the control of the Veterans Administration.

All available space for casketed remains at Fort Rosecrans was exhausted in the late 1960s. In the first decade of the 21st century, the addition of extensive columbaria in place of old chain-link fencing allowed the interment of thousands of additional veterans.

In May 2014, the cemetery had assigned all remaining spaces available; the last recipient of a space was Mary Rossa Luzar, the widow of a U.S. Airman. The only burials that continue to take place are those of eligible spouses or dependents of already-interred veterans. New burials will occur at Miramar National Cemetery.

Fort Rosecrans was listed on the National Register of Historic Places in 2016.

Today, the Fort Rosecrans Memorial Day celebration is the largest Memorial Day festivity in San Diego. The Fort Rosecrans Memorial Day Committee consists of war veterans' organizations, their auxiliaries, and patriotic groups.

== Monuments and memorials ==
Fort Rosecrans National Cemetery has several war memorials, including:

- The granite and bronze memorial to the USS Wasp (CV-7) commemorates the members of the ship's company who were lost when their ship was sunk during the Battle of Guadalcanal on September 15, 1942.
- The San Diego chapter of the Native Sons and Daughters of the Golden West installed the San Pasqual monument in 1922 to honor those soldiers who lost their lives in the 1846 Battle of San Pasqual during the Mexican–American War. The monument is composed of a stone boulder with a bronze plaque mounted on it.
- The USS Bennington Monument is a 75-foot granite obelisk dedicated to the men who lost their lives on that ship in San Diego Harbor on July 21, 1905. The monument was dedicated on January 7, 1908.
- The USS Ommaney Bay (CVE-79) monument is an etched granite memorial to the men lost in action when the ship was sunk on 4 January 1945.
- A monument dedicated to the Mormon Battalion was erected in 1998.
- The Patriots of America memorial was dedicated in 1999 by the California Society of the Order of the Founders and Patriots of America to honor all Americans who answered the call to arms.
- The granite 3rd Infantry Division monument was dedicated to fallen comrades on February 16, 2002.

=== Battle off Samar ===
Several monuments have been erected in memory of the sailors lost in the Battle off Samar, October 25, 1944, a part of the Battle of Leyte Gulf (Philippines), and in subsequent battles of the Pacific:

- The USS St. Lo (CVE-63) and Composite Squadron VC-65 was erected in 1994.
- The USS Hoel (DD-533), USS Johnston (DD-557) and USS Samuel B. Roberts (DE-413) monument is a large granite memorial dedicated in 1995.
- The granite Taffy 3 monument was dedicated on October 24, 1996.
- The granite USS Gambier Bay (CVE-73) monument was dedicated on October 25, 1996. Family members and survivors donated the monument.

== Notable burials ==
=== Medal of Honor recipients ===
(Dates are of the actions for which they were awarded the Medal of Honor.)

- Quartermaster Second Class Charles Francis Bishop (United States occupation of Veracruz), Seizure of Vera Cruz, U.S. Navy. USS Florida (BB-30), Mexico, April 21, 1914
- Commander Willis W. Bradley (World War I), U.S. Navy. USS Pittsburgh (CA-4)
- Major Mason Carter (Indian War Campaign), 5th U.S. Infantry. Bear Paw Mountains, Montana, September 30, 1877
- Staff Sergeant Peter S. Connor (Vietnam War), U.S. Marine Corps, Company F, 2nd Battalion, 3rd Marines, 3rd Marine Division (Reinforced). Quang Ngai Province, Republic of Vietnam, February 25, 1966
- Boatswain's Mate William S. Cronan, U.S. Navy. USS Bennington (PG-4), San Diego, Calif., July 21, 1905
- Lieutenant Junior Grade Albert L. David (World War II), U.S. Navy. USS Pillsbury (DE-133), French West Africa, June 4, 1944
- Corporal James L. Day (World War II), U.S. Marine Corps. Ryukyu Islands, Okinawa, May 14–17, 1945
- Captain Jesse Farley Dyer (Mexican Campaign), U.S. Marine Corps. Vera Cruz, April 21, 1914
- Vice Admiral Middleton S. Elliott (Mexican–American War), U.S. Navy. Vera Cruz, April 21–22, 1914
- Captain Michael John Estocin (Vietnam War), U.S. Navy. Haiphong, North Vietnam, April 20 & 26, 1967
- Lieutenant Junior Grade Donald A. Gary (World War II), U.S. Navy. USS Franklin (CV-13) off Japanese Home Islands near Kobe, Japan, March 19, 1945
- Seaman Ora Graves (World War I), U.S. Navy. USS Pittsburgh (CA-4), July 23, 1917
- Second Lieutenant Herman H. Hanneken (Occupation of Haiti), U.S. Marine Corps. Grande Riviere, Republic of Haiti, October 21 & November 1, 1919
- Gunnery Sergeant Jimmie Earl Howard (Vietnam), U.S. Marine Corps, Company C, 1st Reconnaissance Battalion. Republic of Vietnam, June 16, 1966
- Sergeant Ross L. Iams (Haitian Campaign), U.S. Marine Corps. USS Connecticut (BB-18), Fort Riviere, Republic of Haiti, November 17, 1915
- Ensign Herbert Charpoit Jones (World War II), U.S. Navy. USS California (BB-44), December 7, 1941
- Master at Arms Michael A. Monsoor (Iraq War), U.S. Navy SEAL. Ramadi, Iraq, September 29, 2006
- Coxswain John Edward Murphy (Spanish–American War), U.S. Navy. Santiago, Cuba, June 1898
- Sergeant James Irsley Poynter (Korean War), U.S. Marine Corps. Sudong, Korea, Hill 532, November 4, 1950
- Sergeant Anund C. Roark (Vietnam War), U.S. Army. Kontum Province, Vietnam, May 16, 1968
- Sergeant Henry Frank Schroeder (Spanish–American War), U.S. Army, Company L, 16th U.S. Infantry. Carig, Philippine Islands, September 14, 1900
- Lieutenant Commander Robert Semple (United States occupation of Veracruz), U.S. Navy. Vera Cruz, April 21, 1914
- Lieutenant William Zuiderveld (United States occupation of Veracruz), U.S. Navy. Vera Cruz, April 21, 1914

=== Other burials ===
- Brigadier General Caleb T. Bailey (1898–1957), U.S. Marine Corps, Naval aviator, served in World War II and Korea
- Commander Lloyd M. Bucher (1927–2004), U.S. Navy Captain of the USS Pueblo (AGER-2), which was captured on January 23, 1968, by the North Koreans
- Robert Burnham Jr. (1931–1993), astronomer who worked at the Lowell Observatory in Flagstaff, Arizona
- Lieutenant Florence Choe (1973-2009), U.S. Navy, killed in Afghanistan in a green on blue attack
- Margaret Landis Couper (1890–1981), silent screen actress, wife of First Lieutenant James Hamilton Couper (1894–1953), U.S. Army (World War I)
- Douglas Croft (1926–1963), U.S. Army (World War II), child actor
- Master Chief Petty Officer of the Navy Thomas Sherman Crow (1934–2008), fourth Master Chief Petty Officer of the Navy from 1979 to 1982.
- Captain Thomas Darden (1900–1961), U.S. Navy, 37th Governor of American Samoa
- Admiral Donald C. Davis (1921–1998), U.S. Navy, served in World War II, Korean War and Vietnam War, later commanded the U.S. Pacific Fleet
- Major General Alphonse DeCarre (1892–1977), U.S. Marine Corps, World War I recipient of the Navy Cross, Distinguished Service Cross, Silver Star and Purple Heart
- Lieutenant General Joseph C. Fegan Jr. (1920–1991), U.S. Marine Corps, recipient of two Silver Stars and three Purple Hearts
- Major Reuben H. Fleet (1887–1975), World War I aviator. The Reuben H. Fleet Space Theater and Science Center in San Diego was named after him
- Sally Forrest (1928–2015), actress, wife of Captain Milo Ogden Frank Jr. (1921–2004), U.S. Marine Corps (World War II)
- Corporal Richard Garrick (1878–1962), U.S. Army, film director and actor. He served during the Spanish–American War
- Brigadier General Vernon M. Guymon (1898–1965), U.S. Marine Corps, Naval aviator who earned the Silver Star in World War I as Ground officer, later decorated with the Navy Cross in Nicaragua
- Vice Admiral Edward Hanson (1889–1959), U.S. Navy, 28th Governor of American Samoa and World War I recipient of the Navy Cross
- Mary Beardslee Hinds (1874–1952) – First Lady of Guam.
- Major General Bruno Hochmuth (1911–1967), U.S. Marine Corps, first Marine division commander to be killed in any war
- Major General Archie F. Howard (1892–1964), U.S. Marine Corps, served in World War I, World War II, and China as Commanding General, 6th Marine Division.
- Lieutenant General Victor H. Krulak (1913–2008), U.S. Marine Corps, served in World War II, Korea, and Vietnam in which he served as the Commanding General, Fleet Marine Force, Pacific. He was also the father of retired Marine General Charles Krulak, the 31st U.S. Marine Corps Commandant
- Major General Frank C. Lang (1918–2008), U.S. Marine Corps aviator, served in World War II, Korea, and Vietnam
- Vice Admiral William R. Munroe (1886–1966), United States Navy admiral who commanded ashore and afloat in the Atlantic theater during World War II
- Major General Joseph Henry Pendleton (1860–1942), U.S. Marine Corps general, Navy Cross recipient. Marine Corps Base Camp Pendleton and Pendleton Street in Pacific Beach, San Diego were named after him
- Sergeant Rafael Peralta (1979–2004), U.S. Marine Corps, Second Battle of Fallujah Navy Cross recipient
- Lieutenant General Charles F. B. Price (1881–1954), U.S. Marine Corps, Legion of Merit awardee
- Brigadier general Stanley E. Ridderhof (1896–1962), U.S. Marine Corps, Naval aviator who earned Navy Cross in Nicaragua
- Colonel Thomas Ridgway (1861–1939), U.S. Army officer and father of General Matthew Ridgway
- General Harry Schmidt (1886–1968), U.S. Marine Corps, Navy Cross, Commanded the 4th Marine Division and the Fifth Amphibious Corps, World War II
- Rear Admiral Thomas J. Senn (1871–1947), U.S. Navy, Commander of USS North Dakota and also World War I recipient of the Navy Cross
- Brigadier General Walter Cowen Short (1870–1952), U.S. Army, commander of the 1st Cavalry Division
- General Holland Smith (1884–1967), U.S. Marine Corps, commanded the Fleet Marine Force (FMF) in the Pacific during World War II and led the "island hopping" campaign in the central Pacific
- Eleanor Washington Spicer (1903–1974), 28th President General of the Daughters of the American Revolution
- Lt. Colonel Laurence Stallings (1894–1968), U.S. Marine Corps, a playwright and screenwriter with over two dozen writing credits, including What Price Glory?
- Lt. General John T. Walker (1893–1955), U.S. Marine Corps, commanded 22nd Marine Regiment during World War II and recipient of the Navy Cross
- PHMC Coy Watson Jr. (1912–2009), U.S. Coast Guard, child actor
- Master Chief Petty Officer of the Navy John Donaldson "Jack" Whittet, second Master Chief Petty Officer of the Navy from 1971 to 1975

==== Commonwealth War Graves Commission burials ====
- James Frederick Hynes (1898–1919), Royal Navy of World War I
- Henry John Johnson (1916–1943), Naval Auxiliary Personnel (Merchant Navy) of World War II

== Eligibility ==
Burial in Fort Rosecrans National Cemetery was available for eligible veterans, their spouses and dependents at no cost to the family and includes the gravesite, grave-liner, opening and closing of the grave, a headstone or marker, and perpetual care as part of a national shrine. For veterans, benefits may also include a burial flag (with case for active duty), and military funeral honors. Family members and other loved ones of deceased veterans may request Presidential Memorial Certificates.

Veterans discharged from active duty under conditions other than dishonorable and servicemembers who die while on active duty, active duty for training, or inactive duty training, as well as spouses and dependent children of veterans and active duty servicemembers, may be eligible for VA burial and memorial benefits including burial in a national cemetery. The veteran does not have to die before the spouse or dependent child for that person to be eligible.

Reservists and National Guard members, as well as their spouses and dependent children, are eligible if they were entitled to retired pay at the time of death, or would have been upon reaching requisite age.

Burial of dependent children is limited to unmarried children under 21 years of age, or under 23 years of age if a full-time student at an approved educational institution. Unmarried adult children who become physically or mentally disabled and incapable of self-support before age 21, or age 23 if a full-time student, also are eligible for burial.

A Federal law passed in 2010 (Public Law 111-275) extends burial benefits to certain parents of servicemembers who die as a result of hostile activity or from combat training-related injuries who are buried in a national cemetery in a gravesite with available space. The biological or adopted parents of a servicemember who dies in combat or while performing training in preparation for a combat mission, leaving no surviving spouse or dependent child, may be buried with the deceased servicemember if the Secretary of Veterans Affairs determines that there is available space. The law applies to servicemembers who died on or after Oct. 7, 2001 and to parents who died on or after Oct. 13, 2010.
