= Raymond E. Davis =

American sailor (1885–1965)

- Born: September 19, 1885; Mankato, Minnesota, US
- Died: September 9, 1965 (aged 79); Seattle, Washington, US
- Military career
- Allegiance: United States
- Branch: United States Navy
- Rank: Quartermaster Third Class
- Unit: USS Bennington (PG-4)
- Awards: Medal of Honor

Raymond Erwin Davis (September 19, 1885 – September 9, 1965) was a quartermaster third class serving in the United States Navy who received the Medal of Honor for bravery.

== Biography ==
Born in Mankato, Minnesota, Davis joined the U.S. Navy from Puget Sound, Washington. He was stationed aboard the USS Bennington (PG-4) as a quartermaster third class when, on July 21, 1905, one of the USS Bennington's boilers exploded while it was in San Diego, California. For his actions received the Medal of Honor on January 5, 1906.

He died September 9, 1965, at Retsil Veterans Home, Port Orchard.

== Medal of Honor citation ==
Rank and organization: Quartermaster Third Class U.S. Navy. Place and date: On board the U.S.S. Bennington, 21 July 1905. Entered service at: Puget Sound, Wash. Born: 19 September 1885, Mankato, Minn. G.O. No.: 13, 5 January 1906.

Citation:

Serving on board the U.S.S. Bennington, for extraordinary heroism
displayed at the time of the explosion of a boiler of that vessel
at San Diego, Calif., 21 July 1905.

== See also ==
- List of Medal of Honor recipients during peacetime
