= USS Bennington (PG-4) =

Former United States warship

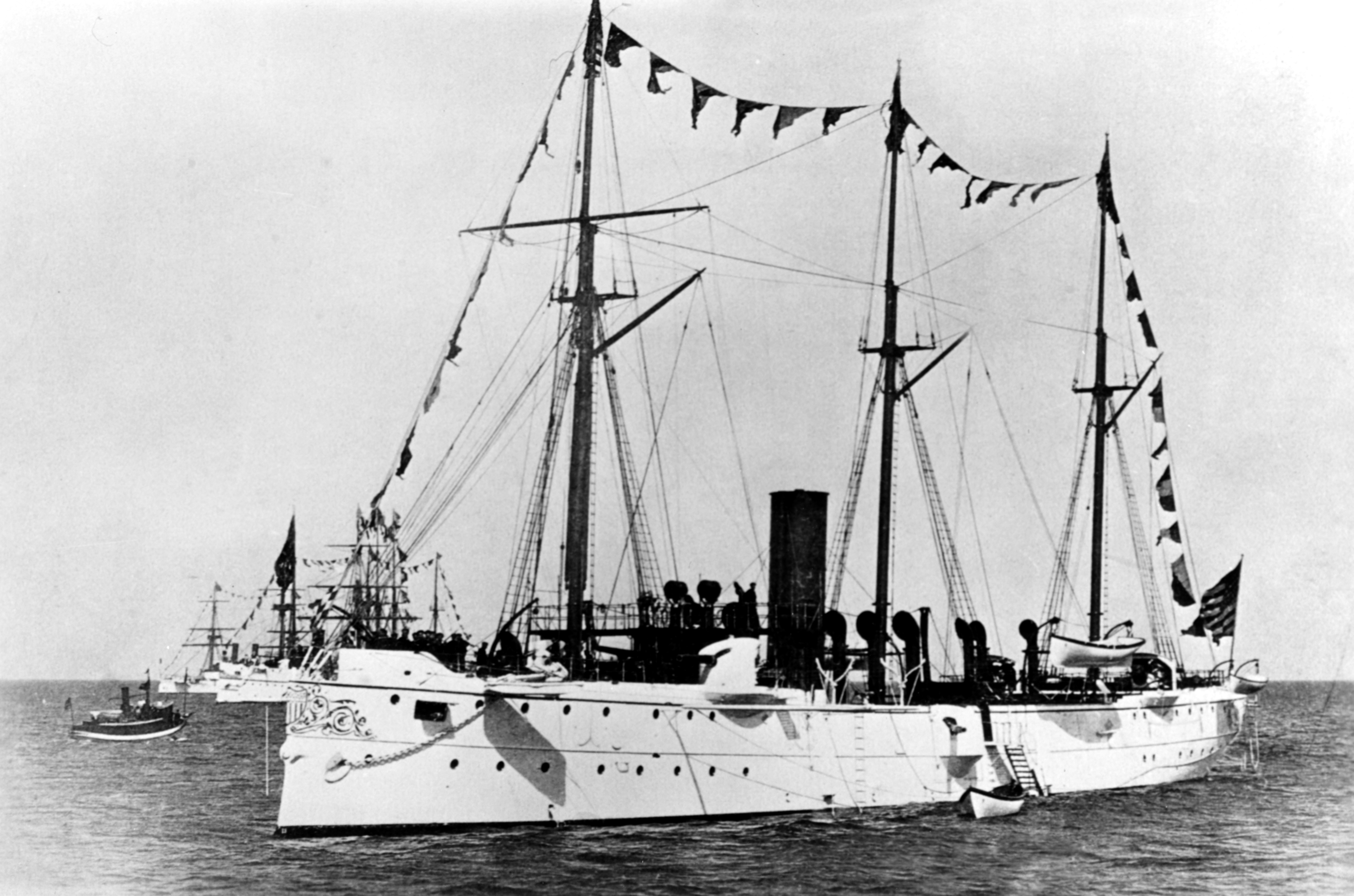
- The Bennington, photographed circa 1898 by William H. Rau

History

United States
- Name: USS Bennington (PG-4)
- Namesake: Bennington, Vermont, site of the Battle of Bennington
- Awarded: 15 November 1887
- Builder: N. F. Palmer & Co.; Hull: Delaware River Shipbuilding
- Cost: $490,000
- Laid down: June 1888
- Launched: 3 June 1890
- Commissioned: 20 June 1891
- Decommissioned: 5 September 1901
- Recommissioned: 2 March 1903
- Decommissioned: 31 October 1905
- Stricken: 10 September 1910
- Fate: Scuttled off Oahu, 1924

General characteristics
- Class & type: Yorktown-class gunboat
- Displacement: 1,710 long tons (1,740 t); 1,910 long tons (1,940 t) (fully loaded)
- Length: 244 ft 5 in (74.50 m) (oa); 230 ft (70 m) (wl); 226 feet (69 m) (lpp)
- Beam: 36 ft (11 m)
- Draft: 14 ft (4.3 m)
- Propulsion: 2 × horizontally mounted triple-expansion steam engines, 3,400 ihp (2,500 kW); 2 × screw propellers; 4 × railroad boilers
- Sail plan: three-masted schooner rig with a total sail area of 6,300 sq ft (590 m^{2})
- Speed: 17.5 knots (32.4 km/h)
- Endurance: 4,262 nautical miles @ 10 knots (7,893 km @ 19 km/h)
- Complement: 197 officers and enlisted
- Armament: 1902: 6 × 6-inch (152 mm)/30 caliber Mark 3 guns; 4 × 6-pounder (57 mm (2.24 in)) guns; 4 × 1-pounder (37 mm (1.46 in)) guns; 2 × .45 in (11 mm) Gatling guns
- Armor: deck: 0.375 inches (9.5 mm); conning tower: 2 inches (51 mm)

USS Bennington (Gunboat No. 4/PG-43) was a member of the Yorktown class of steel-hulled, twin-screw gunboats in the United States Navy in the late 19th and early 20th centuries. She was the first U.S. Navy ship named in honor of the town of Bennington, Vermont, site of the Battle of Bennington in the American Revolutionary War.

The contract to build Bennington was awarded to N. F. Palmer & Co. of Philadelphia in November 1887. Her hull was subcontracted to the Delaware River Iron Shipbuilding & Engine Works which laid down Bennington's keel in June 1888. Bennington was launched in June 1890. She was just over 244 feet (74 m) long and 36 feet (11 m) abeam and displaced 1,710 long tons (1,740 t). She was equipped with two steam engines which were supplemented with three schooner-rigged masts. The ship's main battery consisted of six 6-inch (15.2 cm) guns and was augmented by an assortment of smaller caliber guns.

After her June 1891 commissioning, Bennington was attached to the Squadron of Evolution and for its cruise to South America. The gunboat made two Mediterranean tours between 1892 and 1894, after which she was assigned to the duties in the Pacific. She sailed the Pacific coasts of North and Central America and spent time in the Hawaiian Islands to protect American interests there. On her way to support United States Army operations of the Philippine–American War, Bennington claimed Wake Island for the United States. After two years in the Philippines, she returned to the United States and was decommissioned for 18 months of repairs and refitting. After her March 1903 recommissioning, most of the next two years were spent patrolling the Pacific coasts of North and South America.

On 21 July 1905 at San Diego, California, Bennington suffered a boiler explosion, that killed 66 men and injured nearly everyone else on board. Shortly after the explosion, a tug beached the ship to prevent her from sinking. Eleven men were awarded the Medal of Honor for "extraordinary heroism" in the aftermath of the explosion. After Bennington was refloated, the damage was deemed too extensive to repair and the ship was decommissioned in September. The ship was sold for scrap in 1910, but instead served as a water barge for the Matson Line at Honolulu from 1912. In 1924, the former Bennington was scuttled off the coast of Oahu.

== Design and construction ==
The Yorktown class gunboats – unofficially considered third-class cruisers – were the product of a United States Navy design attempt to produce compact ships with good seakeeping abilities and, yet, able to carry a heavy battery. Bennington was authorized in the 1888 fiscal year, and the contract for her construction was awarded to N. F. Palmer & Co. of Chester, Pennsylvania. The hull for Bennington was subcontracted to the Delaware River Iron Shipbuilding & Engine Works and built to the Navy's Bureau of Construction and Repair design. The mechanical design was patterned after the layout for her older sister ship Yorktown developed by William Cramp & Sons.

Bennington's keel was laid down in June 1888, and the ship was launched on 3 June 1890, sponsored by Anne Aston, the daughter of Rear Admiral Ralph Aston, Chief Engineer of the U.S. Navy.

=== Layout ===
As built, Bennington was 244 feet 5 inches (74.50 m) in length and 36 feet (11 m) abeam. Her steel hull had an average draft of 14 feet (4 m), which was expected to give her the ability to escape from larger ships into shallow water. At the waterline was a turtleback deck of 3/8-inch (9.5 mm) steel that formed a watertight seal over the lower spaces. The deck had a crown at the level of the waterline and curved downwards to 3 feet (0.9 m) below the waterline at the sides of the ship. Below this armored deck were twelve compartments separated by watertight bulkheads; the spaces above were equipped with watertight doors intended to be closed during battle.

Above the armored deck, Bennington had forecastle and poop decks with an open gun deck that spanned the length of the ship between them. The conning tower was located forward on the forecastle deck and was oval-shaped to deflect shot. It was outfitted with a steam-powered Ship's wheel, an engine order telegraph, and speaking tubes; it was protected by 2 inches (51 mm) of steel armor plate.

=== Propulsion ===
Bennington was powered by two triple-expansion steam engines which each drove one of the pair of 10.5-foot (3.2 m), three-bladed screw propellers. The cylinders of each engine were 22, 31, and 51 inches (56, 79, and 130 cm) in diameter and had a 30-inch (76 cm) stroke. Each engine was rated at 3,400 indicated horsepower (2,500 kW) and together were designed to move the ship at 16 knots (30 km/h), though the ship exceeded that in her trials, topping out at 17.5 knots (32.4 km/h).

The engines, situated in separate watertight compartments, were each fed by a pair of coal-fired boilers. Each boiler was horizontally mounted and was 9 feet 6 inches (2.90 m) in diameter and 17 feet 6 inches (5.33 m) in length with a total grate area of 220 square inches (1,400 cm^{2}). Bennington's coal bunkers could carry up to 400 long tons (410 t) of fuel, and were shielded from "shot and shell". At a near top-speed of 16 knots, the ship could cover 2,800 nautical miles (5,200 km) in 6 1/2 days; at the more economical speed of 8 knots (15 km/h) she could cruise 12,000 nautical miles (22,000 km) over 62 days.

To supplement her steam power plant, Bennington was built with three masts that were schooner-rigged. She had a total sail area of 6,300 square feet (590 m^{2}). The steam and sail combination was expected to allow Bennington to remain at sea for months at a time during wartime.

=== Armament ===
Bennington's main battery consisted of six 6-inch (152 mm)/30 caliber Mark 3 guns, (Note: The 30 denotes the length of the gun barrels; in this case, the gun is 30 calibers, meaning that the gun is 30 times long as the diameter of its bore.) with each gun weighing in excess of 11,000 pounds (5,000 kg). Two were mounted on the forecastle deck, two on the poop deck, and the other pair amidships on the gun deck. The two guns on the gun deck were mounted 10 feet (3.0 m) above the waterline, while the other four were 18 feet (5.5 m) above. The guns fired 105-pound (48 kg) armor-piercing projectiles with a propellant charge weighing 18.8 pounds (8.5 kg) at 1,950 feet per second (590 m/s). At an elevation of 30.2°, the guns had a range of 18,000 yards (16,000 m). Each gun was shielded with steel plating 3 inches (76 mm) thick.

Bennington's secondary battery consisted of four 6-pounder (57 mm (2.24 in)) guns, and four 1-pounder (37 mm (1.46 in)) guns. Both were based on designs of the French arms company Hotchkiss. According to a 1902 Bureau of Ordnance publication, an armor-piercing round fired from a 6-pounder gun could penetrate 2 inches (51 mm) of armor at a distance of 1,000 yards (910 m).

== Early career ==
USS Bennington (Gunboat No. 4) was commissioned at the New York Navy Yard on 20 June 1891 under the command of Commander Royal B. Bradford. As one of the first steel-hulled gunboats of the "New Navy", Bennington was assigned to the Squadron of Evolution, a unit made up entirely of "New Navy" ships that was established to test and perfect tactics and doctrine developed at the Naval War College. In addition to operating as the first tactical fleet of the U.S. Navy, the squadron performed the secondary mission of cruising to foreign ports to demonstrate to the world the types of modern ships the United States was capable of building. In that latter role, Bennington and the rest of the squadron departed New York on 19 November 1891 for the unit's cruise to Brazil.

On 5 May 1892, Bennington was transferred to the South Atlantic Squadron and cruised South American waters until 19 July. Setting out from Bahia, Brazil, the gunboat visited Spanish and Italian ports during the 400th anniversary celebration of Columbus' voyage to the western hemisphere. She concluded the European portion of those festivities on 18 February 1893 when she departed Cádiz, with a replica of Columbus's caravel Pinta in tow for Cuba. After stops in the Canary Islands, the Netherlands West Indies, and Havana, the gunboat arrived back in the United States at Hampton Roads, Virginia, on 26 March.

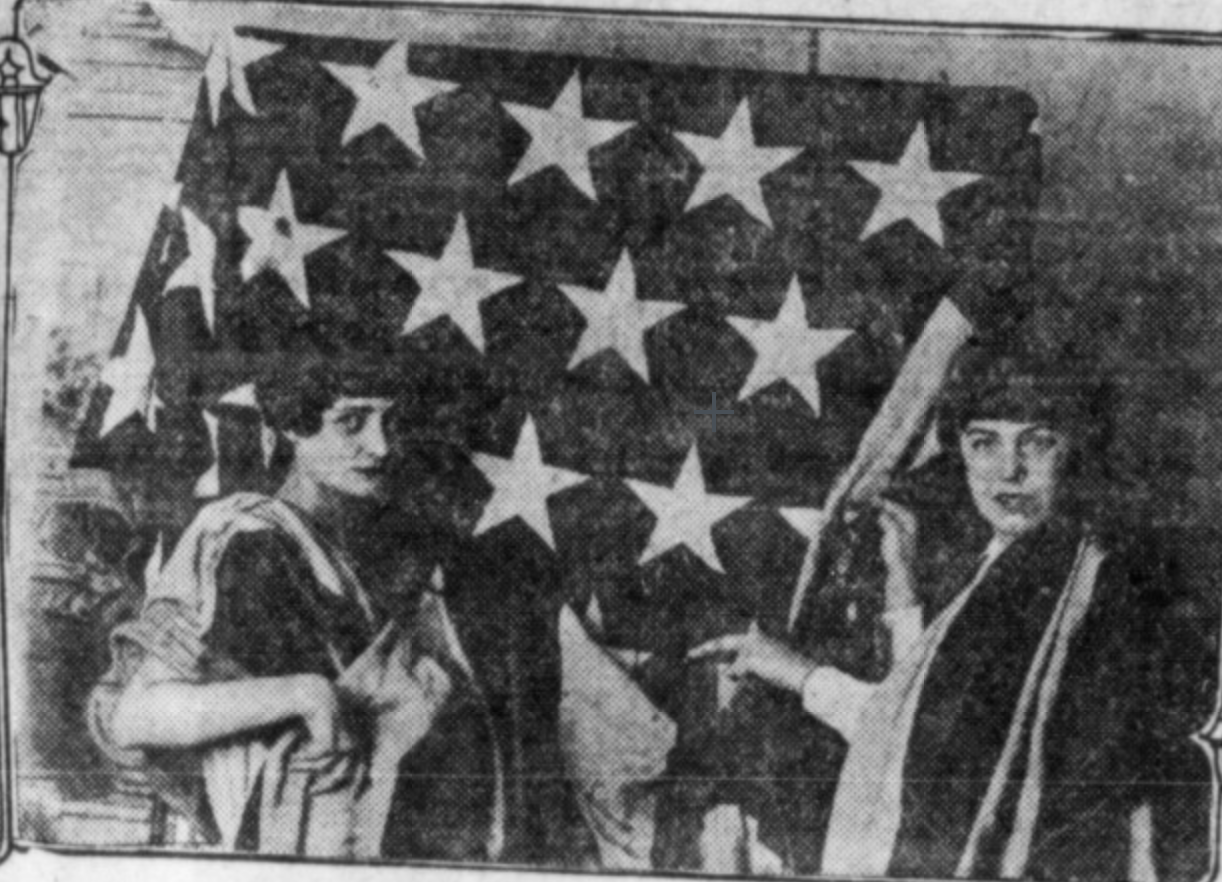
Jack of the ship

Following participation in the 1893 International Naval Review at Hampton Roads, Bennington moved north for operations along the coast of New England before beginning preparations for foreign service. To this end, she entered the New York Navy Yard on 24 May and remained there until 6 August. The ship departed New York on the 6th and arrived in Lisbon on the 18th. She cruised the Mediterranean, visiting various ports along its shores, for the next six months. In February 1894, orders arrived sending her to the Pacific. On the 18th, the gunboat transited the Strait of Gibraltar and headed back across the Atlantic. After steaming around Cape Horn and stopping at several Latin American ports, the warship finally arrived at the Mare Island Navy Yard on 30 April.

== Pacific Duty ==
Bennington served in the Pacific for a little more than four years. For the most part, her duty consisted of cruising along the west coast protecting American interests in Latin America during the numerous political upheavals that occurred at that time in Central and South America. In addition, she made two extended cruises to the Hawaiian Islands. The first came after a group of pro-royalists attempted in January 1895 to stage a countercoup against the provisional government of the islands. Bennington departed Mare Island on 28 May, arrived at Honolulu on 5 June, and spent the next nine months protecting American interests in the islands. On 5 March 1896, she departed Honolulu, bound for San Francisco where she arrived on 16 March. The following day, the warship entered the Mare Island Navy Yard for five months of repairs.

On 8 August, she resumed cruises along the west coast. That employment lasted a year and a week. On 14 August 1897, Bennington headed back to Hawaii. She arrived in Lahaina Roads on 27 September and reached Honolulu on the 30th. Except for a six-day cruise back to Lahaina in March 1898, the gunboat remained at Honolulu for just over nine months.

At the outbreak of the Spanish–American War, Bennington was in Hawaiian waters. After spending the first two months of the war in the Hawaiian Islands, she departed Honolulu on 16 June and steamed to the west coast of the United States. The warship arrived in San Francisco on 26 June and patrolled the California coast for the remainder of hostilities. On 18 September, Bennington stood out of San Francisco on her way ultimately to the Philippines. She arrived in Hawaii on 27 September and devoted a little over three months to operations in nearby waters. On 7 January 1899, she resumed her voyage west. Ten days out of Honolulu, she stopped at Wake Island. There Commander Edward D. Taussig, Bennington's commander, under direct orders from President William McKinley claimed the atoll for the United States, despite protests from Germany (which considered the island group a part of its claim of the Marshall Islands). Wake eventually became an important link in the Honolulu–Manila trans-Pacific cable. Bennington later made a stop at San Luis d'Apra, Guam, from 23 January to 15 February where Commander (later Rear Admiral) Taussig accepted the relinquishment of Guam from her Spanish colonial governor. Taussig briefly served as the first naval governor of Guam and established a native ruling council, before continuing on to Manila where Bennington arrived on 22 February.

== Philippine–American War ==
For a little more than two years after her February 1899 arrival, Bennington served in the Philippine Islands in support of the Army's campaigns during the Philippine–American War. For the most part, her service in the islands consisted of patrol and escort duty – preventing rebel movement and stopping the importation of arms, as well as seeing American troops and supplies safely between the islands. Occasionally, Bennington did see action. On 10 September, she shelled a fort near Legaspi on the southeastern coast of Luzon. Two days later, she captured and destroyed the insurgent vessel Parao. Between 7 and 9 November, the warship supported an Army landing at San Fabian on the shores of Lingayen Gulf in northwestern Luzon. The gunboat began a four-month assignment as station ship at Cebu on 26 November and concluded that duty on 19 March 1900.

After visiting Cavite on Luzon, the gunboat headed for Japan on 3 April and underwent repairs there from 9 April to 19 May before heading back to the Philippines. The warship arrived at Cavite on 27 May and resumed patrols on 3 June. She spent another seven months conducting patrols in the Philippines and supporting the Army's operations in the island chain. On 3 January 1901, she departed Cavite and shaped a course for Hong Kong. The gunboat arrived in that British colony on the 6th and began over six months of repairs. At the completion of that work, she departed Hong Kong on 25 June. After a visit to Shanghai, the warship headed back to the United States in July and arrived at the Mare Island Navy Yard on 19 August. She was decommissioned there on 5 September 1901.

While she was out of commission at Mare Island, Bennington was refitted. A pilothouse that had been added on top of her bridge and a spotlight platform on her bow – both added in 1893–94 – were removed. Bennington's mainmast was also removed, leaving her as a two-mast rig. In addition, two tall ventilation cowls were added immediately behind the bridge. After 18 months of inactivity, Bennington was recommissioned on 2 March 1903 under the command of Commander Chauncey Thomas.

Over the next 27 months, Bennington cruised in the eastern Pacific along the coasts of North and South America. The warship visited Alaskan ports in the summer of 1903 and the coast of Central America the following fall and winter. In May 1904, she steamed to Hawaii and then proceeded to the Aleutians in June. The winter of 1904 and 1905 saw her voyage south for visits to Pacific ports in Central and South America. In February 1905, she departed San Francisco for a two-month cruise to the Hawaiian Islands, returning to San Diego on 19 July, after a difficult 17-day voyage.

== Boiler explosion ==
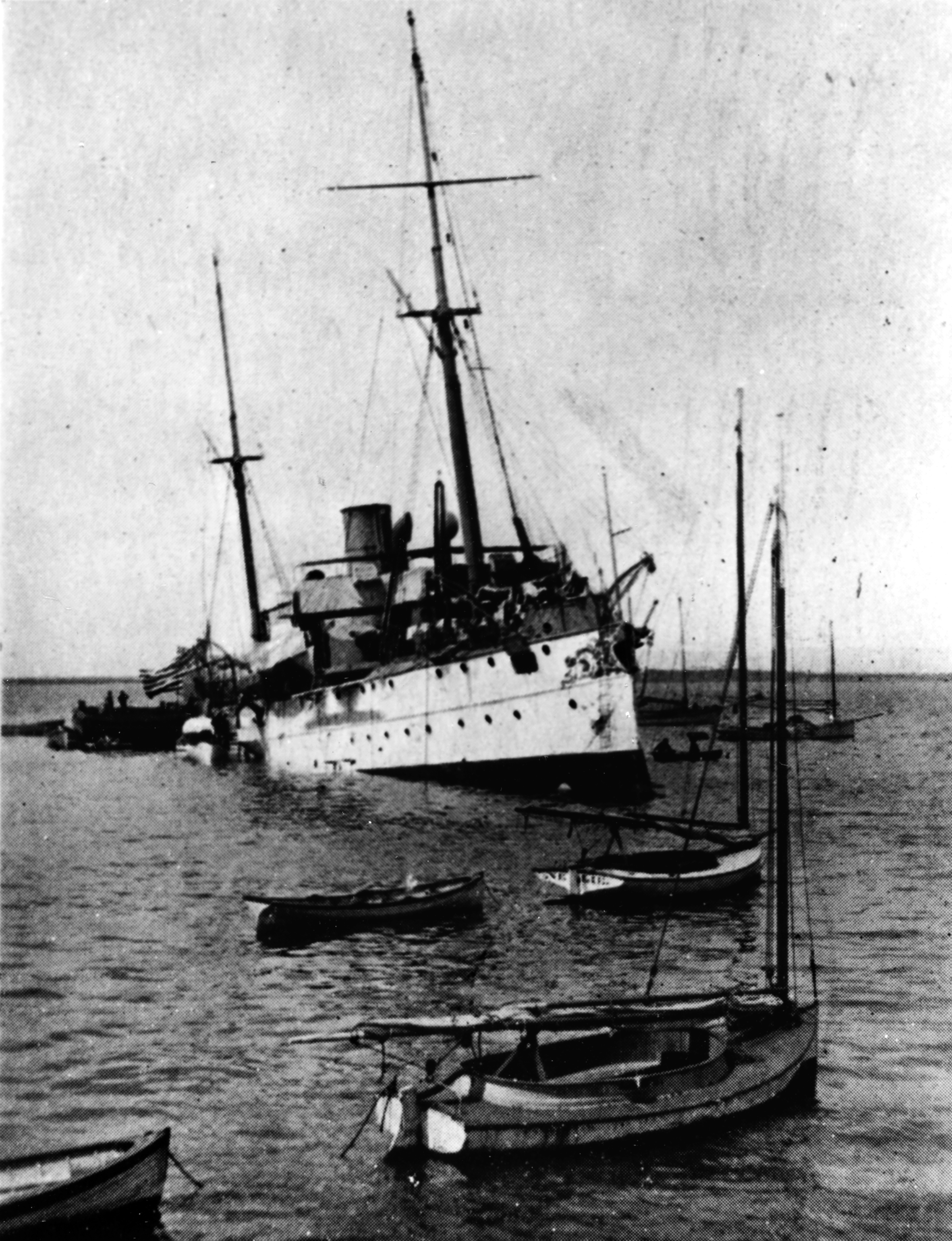
Removing the dead from the ship, following her boiler explosion

On the morning of 21 July 1905, Bennington's crew was preparing her to sail to the aid of the monitor Wyoming which had broken down and was in need of a tow. After her crew had finished the difficult task of coaling the ship that morning, most of them were belowdecks cleaning themselves from the dirty job. Unbeknownst to anyone on board, three problems with one of Bennington's boilers – oily feed water, an improperly closed steam valve, and a faulty steam gauge – were conspiring against them. At about 10:30, excessive steam pressure in the boiler resulted in a boiler explosion that rocked the ship, sending men and equipment flying into the air. The escaping steam sprayed through the living compartments and decks. The explosion opened Bennington's hull to the sea, and she began to list to starboard. Quick actions by the tug Santa Fe – taking Bennington under tow and beaching her – almost certainly saved the gunboat from sinking.

The combination of the explosion and the scalding steam killed a number of men outright and left others mortally wounded; the final death toll was one officer and sixty-five men, making it one of the U.S. Navy's worst peacetime disasters. Nearly all of the forty-six who survived had an injury of some sort; eleven of the survivors were awarded the Medal of Honor for "extraordinary heroism displayed at the time of the explosion". One of the survivors was John Henry Turpin, an African-American who had also survived the explosion of Maine in Havana in February 1898 and was, reportedly, the only man to survive both explosions. The sheer number of casualties – the death toll exceeded the U.S. Navy's death toll for the entirety of the Spanish–American War – overwhelmed San Diego's medical facilities, and many burn victims had to be cared for in makeshift facilities tended by volunteers.

The number of dead also taxed the morticians in San Diego, who were hard-pressed to prepare all of the victims for burial. On 23 July, two days after the explosion, the majority of those killed were buried in the cemetery at Fort Rosecrans. The victims are commemorated by the USS Bennington Monument, a 60-foot (18 m) granite obelisk dedicated in the cemetery on 7 January 1908.

In spite of rumors of misconduct by Bennington's engineering crewmen, an official investigation concluded that the explosion was not due to negligence on the part of the crew.

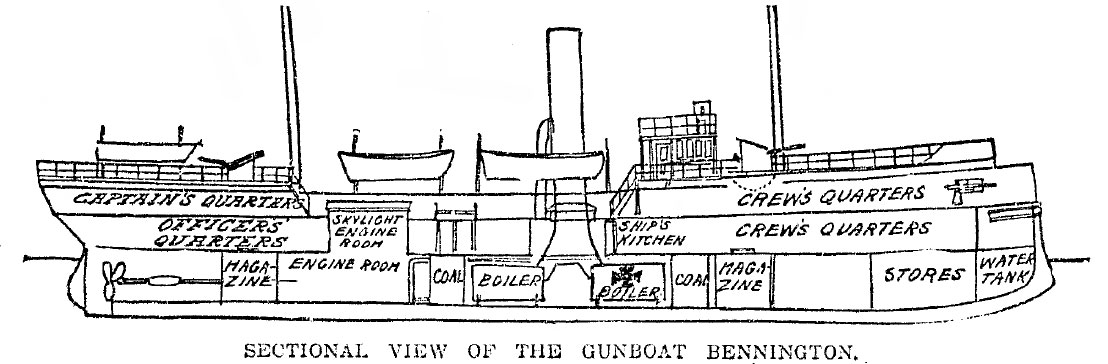
Sectional view of the gunboat Bennington – Boston Daily Globe, 23 July 1905

=== List of Medal of Honor recipients from explosion ===
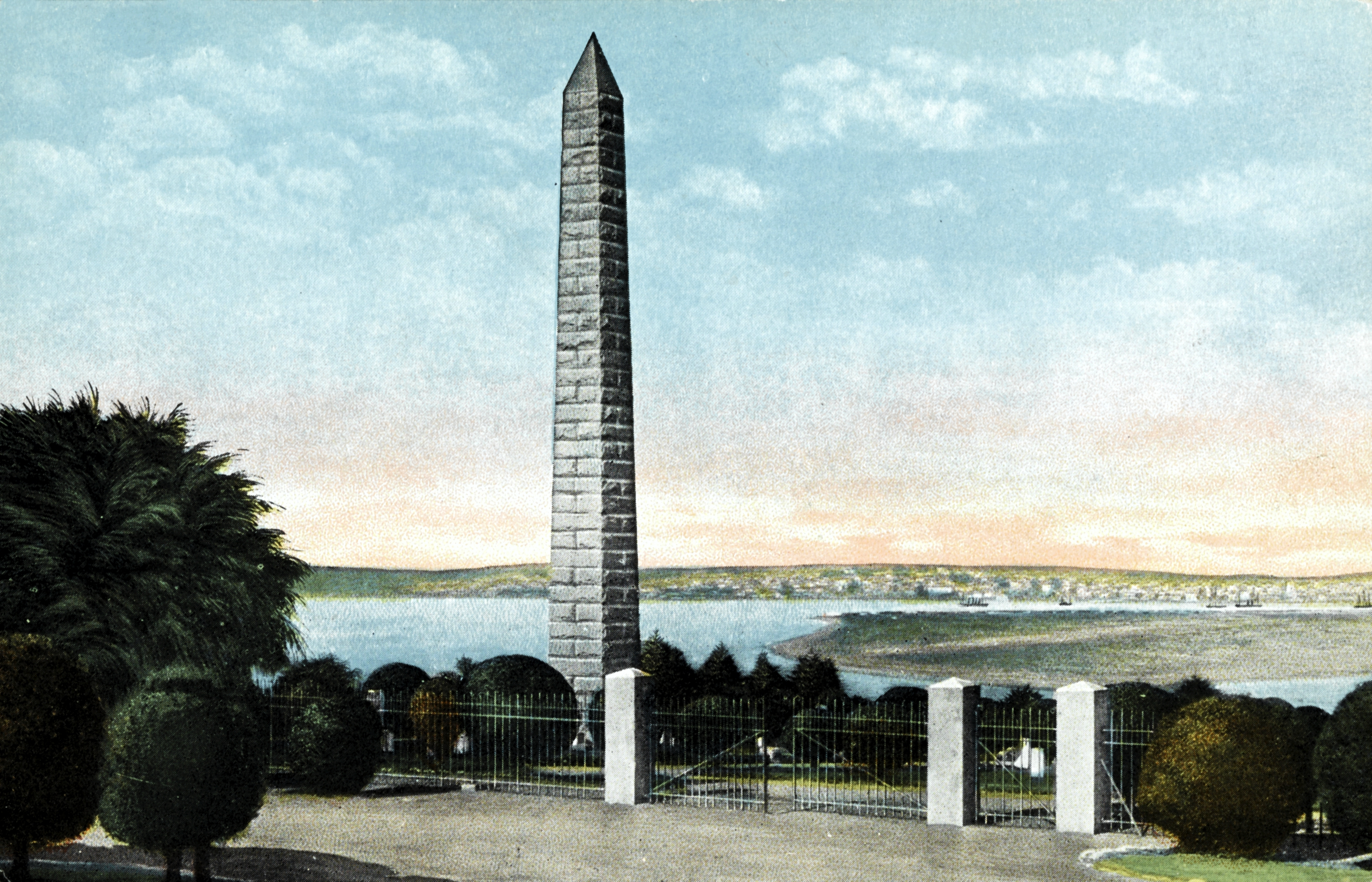
The USS Bennington Monument in San Diego commemorates the 66 killed in the 21 July 1905 boiler explosion.

The eleven men who were awarded the Medal of Honor for "extraordinary heroism displayed at the time of the explosion" were:

- Edward William Boers, Seaman
- George F. Brock, Carpenter's Mate Second Class
- Raymond E. Davis, Quartermaster Third Class
- John J. Clausey, Chief Gunner's Mate (retired as a Lieutenant (O-3) after World War I)
- Willie Cronan, Boatswain's Mate (retired as Lieutenant Commander (O-4) after World War II)
- Emil Fredericksen, Watertender
- Rade Grbitch, Seaman
- Frank E. Hill, Ship's Cook First Class
- Oscar Frederick Nelson, Machinist's Mate First Class
- Otto Diller Schmidt, Seaman
- William Sidney Shacklette, Hospital Steward

Also aboard was John Henry Turpin, an African-American sailor who was aboard the USS Maine when she exploded in Havana harbor in 1898 and would go on to become one of the first African-American Chief Petty Officers in the U.S. Navy.

== Disposition ==
After the explosion, Bennington was refloated and towed to the Mare Island Navy Yard. Because of the extent of the damage and the age of the ship, Bennington was not repaired but was instead decommissioned on 31 October 1905. After five years of inactivity, Bennington was struck from the Naval Vessel Register on 10 September 1910 and sold for scrap on 14 November. Bennington was not scrapped but was purchased in 1913 by the Matson Line for use as a molasses barge. She was towed to Honolulu and remained in use there from 1913 until 1924, when she was scuttled off Oahu.

== Bibliography ==
- Bauer, K. Jack; Roberts, Stephen S. (1991). Register of Ships of the U.S. Navy, 1775–1990: Major Combatants. New York: Greenwood Press. ISBN 978-0-313-26202-9. OCLC 24010356.
- Benham, Edith Wallace (1913). Ships of the United States Navy and Their Sponsors, 1797–1913. Norwood, Massachusetts: Privately Printed. OCLC 7397146.
- Dyal, Donald H. (1996). Historical Dictionary of the Spanish American War. Westport, Connecticut: Greenwood Press. ISBN 978-0-313-28852-4. OCLC 32854963.
- Linder, Bruce (2001). San Diego's Navy. Annapolis, Maryland: Naval Institute Press. ISBN 1-55750-531-4.
- "Captain William Matson". Pacific Marine Review. 14 (November 1917). San Francisco: J.S. Hines. 1917.
- Pourade, Richard F. (1965). Gold in the Sun (1st ed.). San Diego: The Union-Tribune Publishing Company. ISBN 0-913938-04-1.
- Silverstone, Paul H. (2006). The New Navy, 1883–1922. New York: Routledge. ISBN 978-0-415-97871-2. OCLC 63171106.
- United States Navy Department (1902). Annual reports of the Navy Department for the year 1902. Washington, D.C.: Government Printing Office.
