= Henry F. Schroeder =

American soldier

Henry F. Shroeder
- Born: December 7, 1874; Chicago, Illinois, US
- Died: January 26, 1959 (aged 84)
- Burial place: Fort Rosecrans National Cemetery; Point Loma, California
- Military career
- Allegiance: United States of America
- Branch: United States Army
- Service years: 1896 – 1930
- Rank: Major
- Unit: 16th Infantry Regiment
- Conflicts: Philippine–American War
- Awards: Medal of Honor; Purple Heart

Henry Frank Schroeder (December 7, 1874 – January 26, 1959) was a soldier in the United States Army who received the Medal of Honor during the Philippine–American War at Carig in the Philippines.

Schroeder joined the Army from Chicago in July 1896, and permanently retired with the rank of Major in August 1930.

== Medal of Honor citation ==
Rank and organization: Sergeant, Company L, 16th U.S. Infantry. Place and date: At Carig, Philippine Islands, September 14, 1900. Entered service at: Chicago, Ill. Birth: Chicago, Ill. Date of issue: March 10, 1902.

Citation:

With 22 men defeated 400 insurgents, killing 36 and wounding 90.

== After the war ==
Schroeder died in 1959 and is buried at the Fort Rosecrans National Cemetery in Point Loma, California.

== See also ==
- List of Medal of Honor recipients
