= John J. Clausey =

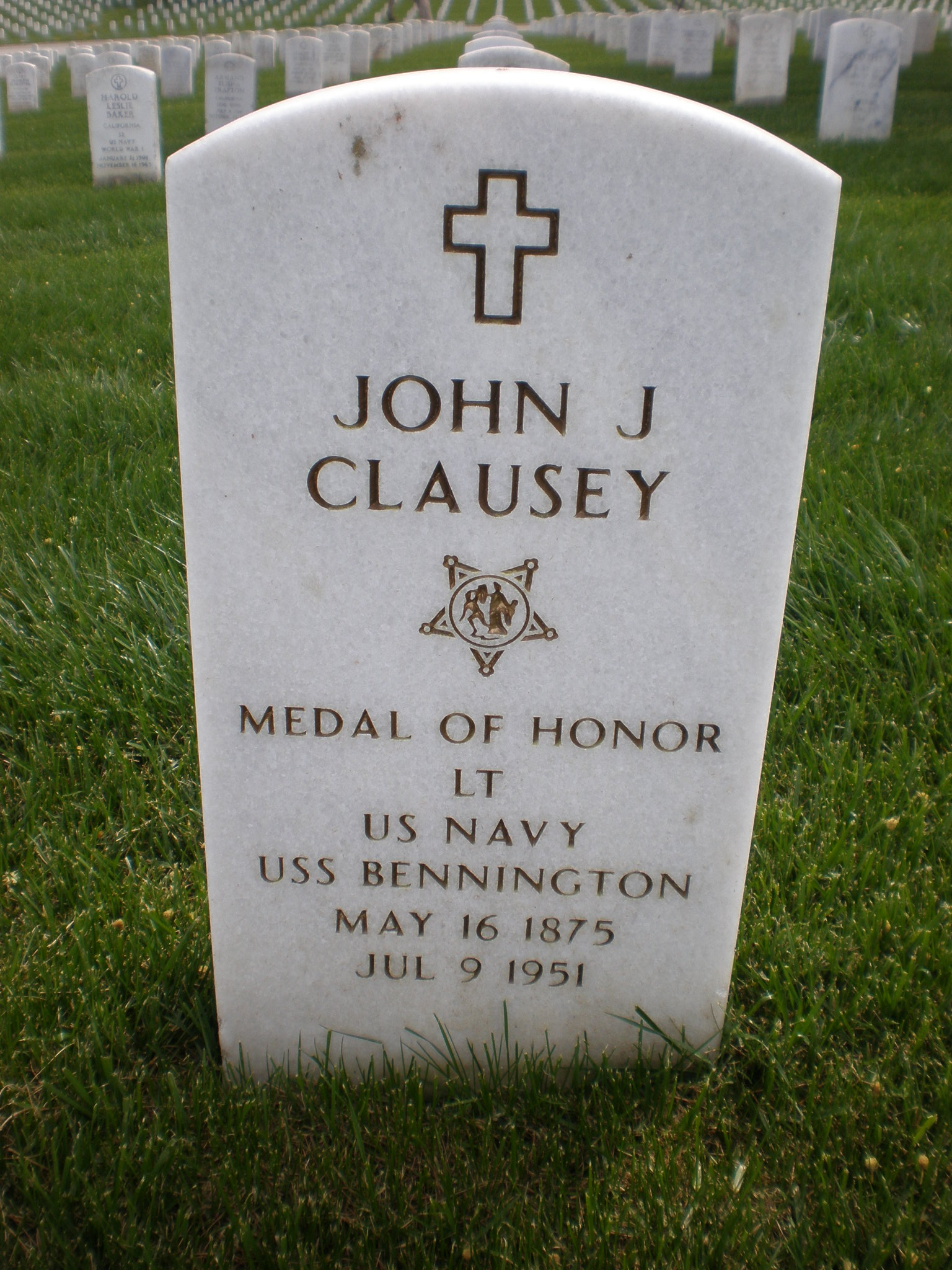
- Clausey grave
- Born: May 16, 1875; San Francisco, California, U.S.
- Died: September 9, 1951 (aged 76); Oakland, California, U.S.
- Burial place: Golden Gate National Cemetery San Bruno, California
- Military career
- Allegiance: United States
- Branch: United States Navy
- Rank: Lieutenant
- Unit: USS Bennington (PG-4)
- Awards: Medal of Honor

John Joseph Clausey (May 16, 1875 – September 9, 1951) was a chief gunner's mate serving in the United States Navy during who received the Medal of Honor for bravery.

== Biography ==
John Joseph Clausey was born on 16 October 1877 at 12 Canterbury Street, in Garston, Lancashire, and baptised on 21 October 1877 at St Augustini in Liverpool, England, under the name Joannes Joseph Closley. His parents were Thomas Closley and Catherine (Kate) Burke. J. J. Clausey emigrated to the USA under the name Joseph Closey with his mother and siblings on board the Peruvian, arriving in New York on 12 March 1883. J. J. Clausey enlisted in the US Navy, giving his date of birth as 16 May 1875 and place of birth as San Francisco. This incorrect information is now on all the official US records. He was stationed aboard the USS Bennington (PG-4) as a chief gunner's mate. On July 21, 1905, one of the USS Bennington's boilers exploded while it was in San Diego, California. For his actions he received the Medal of Honor on January 5, 1906.

Clausey was warranted as a gunner on February 3, 1908. In the 1910 US Census, J. J. Clausey was recorded on board the USS Charleston in Kobe, Japan and gives his place of birth as England. He was promoted to chief gunner on February 3, 1914. During World War I he received a temporary promotion to lieutenant on July 1, 1918.

He was promoted permanently to lieutenant on December 31, 1921, and retired from the Navy on August 1, 1929.

He died September 9, 1951, and is buried in Golden Gate National Cemetery in San Bruno, California.

== Medal of Honor citation ==
Rank and organization: Chief Gunner's Mate, U.S. Navy. Born: May 16, 1875, San Francisco, Calif. Accredited to: California. G.O. No.: January 13, 5, 1906.

Citation:

On board the U.S.S. Bennington for extraordinary heroism displayed at the time of the explosion of a boiler of that vessel at San Diego, Calif., 21 July 1905.

== See also ==
- List of Medal of Honor recipients in non-combat incidents
