= Florence Choe =

American naval officer (died 2009)

Florence B. Choe
- Florence B. Choe navy biography portrait
- Born: Florence Bacong; November 26, 1973; Naval Medical Center San Diego, California, US
- Died: March 27, 2009 (aged 35); Camp Shaheen, Mazar-i-Sharif, Islamic Republic of Afghanistan
- Cause of death: Killed in action
- Burial place: Fort Rosecrans National Cemetery, San Diego, California; 32.68651°N 117.24513°W
- Education: University of California, San Diego; San Diego State University
- Spouse: Chong "Jay" Choe
- Children: 1
- Military career
- Branch: United States Navy
- Service years: 2001–2009
- Rank: Lieutenant (O-3)
- Nickname: Flo
- Unit: Combined Security Transition Command – Afghanistan
- Awards: Bronze Star Medal, Purple Heart Medal, Navy and Marine Corps Commendation Medal

Florence Choe, née Bacong (26 November 1973 – 27 March 2009), was an American naval officer who was killed in action at Camp Shaheen during a green on blue attack. Choe, a Filipino American was born in San Diego, followed her father in serving in the United States Navy after the September 11th Attacks, and died while deployed to Afghanistan.

== Early life ==
Choe was born to parents from the Philippines, with her dad being a United States Navy cook. (Note: Choe's parents were Rufino and Francisca Bacong. Rufino was a career sailor.) Choe was born at Naval Medical Center San Diego. Choe went to elementary school in Spring Valley; then graduated from Monte Vista High School. Choe earned an associate's degree at Cuyamaca Community College in 1994. She went on to earn a bachelor's degree from University of California, San Diego in 1997, and a master's degree in public health from San Diego State University in 2001.

== Military career ==
Choe joined the Navy after the September 11th attacks, walking into a recruiting office with her father on 13 September 2001. She was commissioned into the Navy Medical Service Corps on 21 February 2002. While stationed at National Naval Medical Center, she met her future husband Chong "Jay" Choe, another naval officer and a doctor; on 21 June 2004, they married. While both of them were stationed on Okinawa, Choe gave birth to their daughter; they would later have a change of station to Naval Medical Center San Diego, where her husband would have his residency. While at Naval Medical Center San Diego, Choe was its governing board's executive assistant. In May 2008, Choe voluntarily deployed to Afghanistan.

While deployed to Afghanistan, with encouragement from a San Diego-based nonprofit United Through Reading, Choe began to record herself reading books for her daughter, and sent them home for her daughter to watch. In doing so, she maintained the bond with her daughter, making a reunion while on leave from deployment a painless one. Other servicemembers were able to utilize the recording facilities that Choe created to also make recordings for their children. In March 2009, an Afghan shot and killed Choe, Lieutenant (junior grade) Francis Toner, (Note: Toner was posthumously awarded a Silver Star Medal for attempting to stop the Afghan. It was initially awarded as a Bronze Star Medal with Valor; a bridge aboard Naval Station Newport was named for Toner.) and injured Captain Kim Lebel, before turning the weapon onto himself and taking his own life. (Note: Sources conflict as to whether the Afghan shooter was a Afghan National Army soldier, or an insurgent pretending to be one. Later investigation revealed that the shooter was shot three times, calling to question whether the shooter died by suicide.)

== Legacy ==
Florence Bacong Choe's headstone at Fort Rosecrans National Cemetery

One of her brothers, Ron, would later credit her for getting him to resume his advancement in education. Choe's death made her husband one of a few dozen gold star widowers of the Iraq and Afghanistan wars. Choe was buried at Fort Rosecrans National Cemetery, and is buried nearby Michael Monsoor. (Note: At the time of her death Choe's hometown was listed as El Cajon.)

In November 2009, Choe's husband received an award from United Through Reading on her behalf. Lebel listed both Choe and Toner into the National Purple Heart Hall of Honor. Choe's daughter is a recipient of a scholarship from Folds of Honor. In 2013, a quilt was made to honor Choe and several other San Diego County fallen servicemembers, and was displayed during a quilt show. On Memorial Day 2017, an individual involved with the Truman National Security Project placed a rose at Choe's gravesite. On Memorial Day 2018, Choe's service was memorialized at an event in Bremerton, Washington.
