= USS Bennington Monument =

Naval memorial at Fort Rosecrans National Cemetery, San Diego, California

Coordinates: 32°41′23″N 117°15′08″W

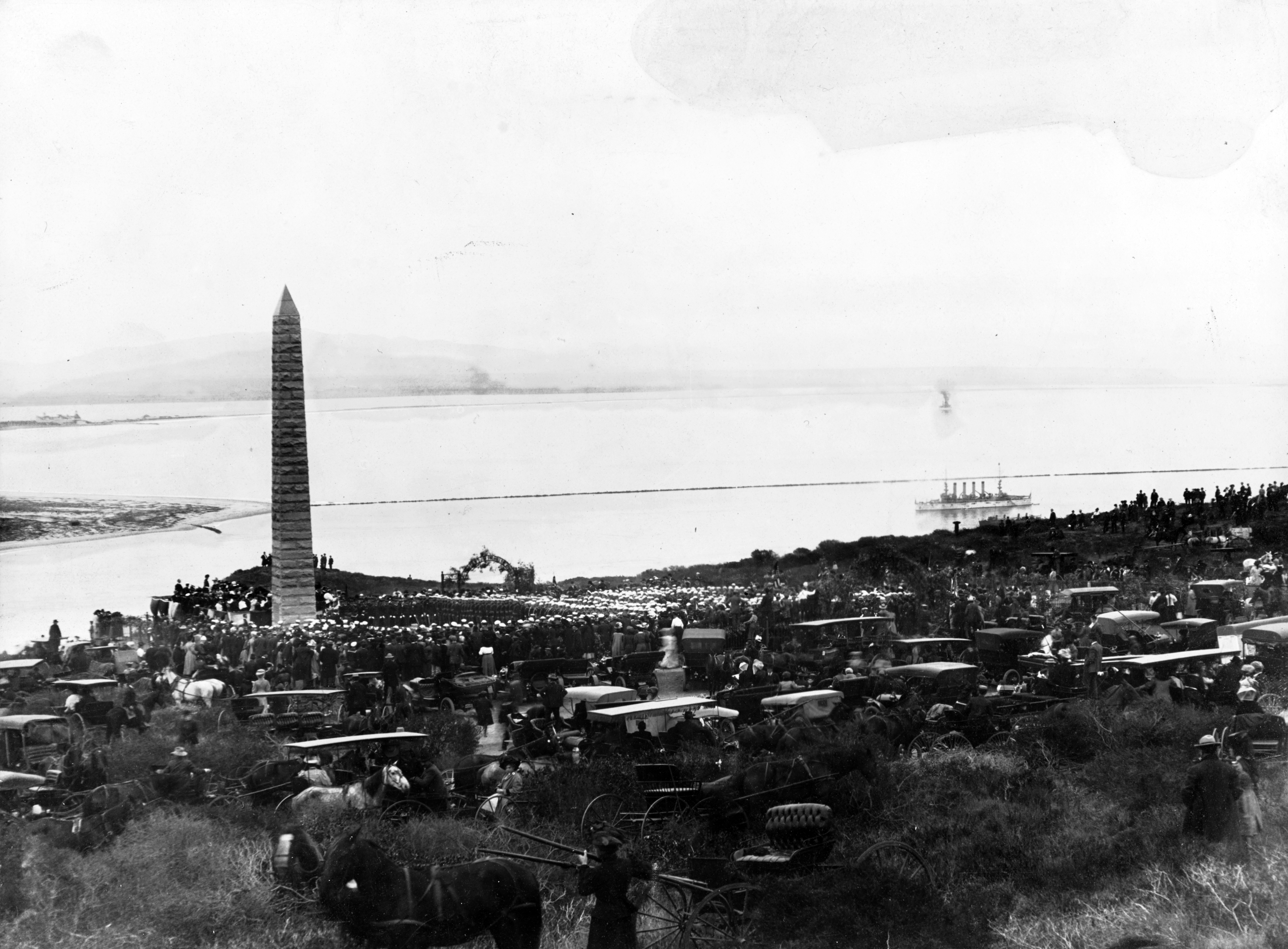
Dedication of the USS Bennington Monument, San Diego, California, 1908.

The USS Bennington Monument is a 60-foot (18 m) granite obelisk in the Fort Rosecrans National Cemetery, Point Loma, San Diego, California, United States. It serves as a memorial to the crew of the USS Bennington (PG-4), a gunboat of the United States Navy, whose boiler exploded on the morning of 21 July 1905, in San Diego Bay. The explosion showered the vessel with live steam and scalding water, killing 66 men (1 officer and 65 other sailors) and burning an additional 46. It was the worst peacetime disaster for the U.S. Navy up to that time.

The dead were buried at Fort Rosecrans; some were later disinterred and shipped home for burial by their families. The monument at the site of the graves was dedicated three years later, on 7 January 1908.

== See also ==
- Other US Navy Memorials
