= Emil Fredericksen =

- Born: 1867; Copenhagen, Denmark
- Died: 1950 (aged 82–83); Seattle, Washington
- Burial place: Evergreen Washelli Memorial Park, Seattle
- Military career
- Allegiance: United States of America
- Branch: United States Navy
- Service years: 1897–1930
- Rank: Chief watertender
- Unit: USS Bennington (PG-4)
- Awards: Medal of Honor

Emil Fredericksen or Fredreksen (1867–1950) was a United States Navy sailor and a recipient of the U.S. military's highest decoration, the Medal of Honor. He earned the award for rescuing injured shipmates despite hazardous conditions following a 1905 boiler explosion aboard his ship, USS Bennington (PG-4).

== Biography ==
Born in Copenhagen in 1867, Fredericksen immigrated to the United States at age 17. He enlisted in the U.S. Navy in 1897 and served on more than 20 ships in roles such as boilermaker, fireman and quartermaster. He was stationed aboard the gunboat USS Bennington (PG-4) as a watertender, a position which required him to tend the fires and boilers in the ship's engine room.

On July 21, 1905, Bennington was off San Diego, California, when a boiler exploded, killing 66 and seriously wounding 46 of the 179 men aboard. In the immediate aftermath, Fredericksen "[w]as prominent in the work of rescuing the injured from confined spaces below decks" despite those areas being "filled with blinding steam and the decks covered with scalding water; and while the ship was heavily listed, rapidly filling, and thought liable to sink at any moment." Eleven sailors, including Fredericksen, were awarded the Medal of Honor on January 5, 1906, for their efforts to save their crewmates and the ship.

Fredericksen served on active duty in the U.S. Navy until 1925 and in the Naval Reserve until 1930, reaching the rank of chief watertender. After leaving active duty, he lived in Keyport, Washington, and worked for the Howard S. Wright & Co. construction company in nearby Bremerton. In 1944 he moved to Seattle and died of natural causes at the U.S. Marine Hospital in 1950.

Fredericksen had no known next of kin and was buried at Seattle's Evergreen Washelli Memorial Park without ceremony and with only a temporary grave marker. The location of his grave was lost to history until 2016, when a researcher with the Medal of Honor Historical Society tracked him through pension records and re-discovered his burial place. A graveside memorial service with full military honors was held on March 25, 2016.

== Medal of Honor citation ==
- Rank and organization: Watertender, U.S. Navy
- G.O. No.: 13, 5 January 1906

Citation:

Serving on board the U.S.S. Benington [sic], for extraordinary heroism displayed at the time of the explosion of a boiler of that vessel at San Diego, Calif., 21 July 1905.

== See also ==
- List of Medal of Honor recipients in non-combat incidents
