= George F. Brock =

United States Navy Medal of Honor recipient

- Born: October 18, 1872; Cleveland, Ohio
- Died: October 12, 1914 (aged 41); Marin County, California
- Military career
- Allegiance: United States of America
- Branch: United States Navy
- Service years: c. 1905 – c. 1910
- Rank: Carpenter's Mate Second Class
- Unit: USS Bennington
- Conflicts: Non-combat award
- Awards: Medal of Honor

George Frederick Brock (October 18, 1872 – October 12, 1914) was a United States Navy Carpenter's Mate received the Medal of Honor for actions on board the USS Bennington off San Diego, California during a boiler explosion which killed 62 enlisted men and one officer.

The 1910 United States census records him as still serving in the Navy. He died October 12, 1914, in Marin County, California. He is buried at San Francisco National Cemetery.

== Medal of Honor citation ==
Rank and organization: Carpenter's Mate Second Class, U.S. Navy. Born: October 18, 1872, Cleveland, Ohio. Accredited to: California. G.O. No.: 13, January 5, 1906.

Citation:

Serving on board the U.S.S. Bennington for extraordinary heroism displayed at the time of the explosion of that vessel at San Diego, Calif., 21 July 1905.

== See also ==
- List of Medal of Honor recipients in non-combat incidents
