= Ora Graves =

United States Navy Medal of Honor recipient

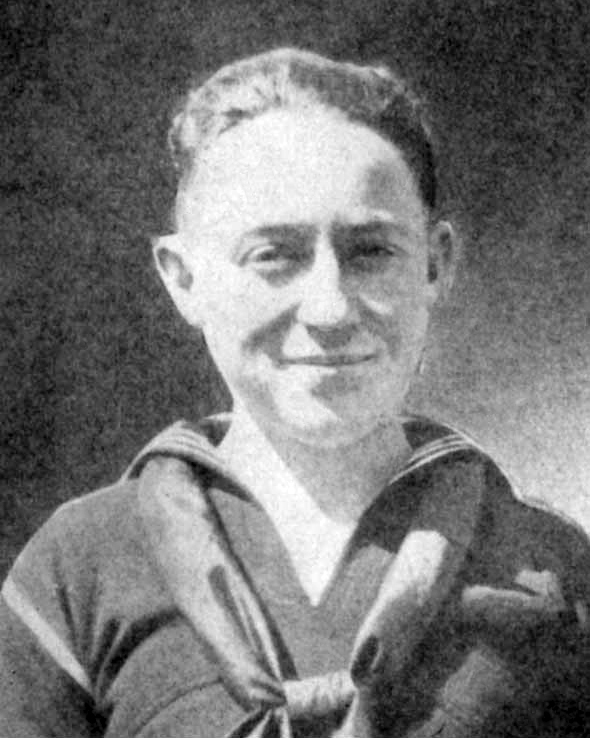
- Ora Graves
- Born: July 26, 1896; Las Animas, Colorado
- Died: September 28, 1961 (aged 65); El Cajon, California, U.S.
- Burial place: Fort Rosecrans National Cemetery San Diego, California
- Military career
- Allegiance: United States of America
- Branch: United States Navy
- Rank: Gunner's Mate Second Class
- Unit: USS Pittsburgh
- Conflicts: World War I
- Awards: Medal of Honor

Ora Graves (July 26, 1896 – September 28, 1961) was a sailor in the United States Navy who received the Medal of Honor for his actions during World War I.

== Biography ==
Graves was born in Las Animas, Colorado, on July 26, 1896. He died September 28, 1961, and is buried in Fort Rosecrans National Cemetery San Diego, California. His gravesite is located in section W grave 1208.

== Medal of Honor citation ==
Rank and organization: Seaman, U.S. Navy. Born: 26 July 1896, Los Animas, Colo. Accredited to: Nebraska. G.O. No.: 366, 1918.

Citation:

For extraordinary heroism on 23 July 1917, while the U.S.S. Pittsburgh was proceeding to Buenos Aires, Argentina. A 3-inch saluting charge exploded, causing the death of C. T. Lyles, seaman. Upon the explosion, Graves was blown to the deck, but soon recovered and discovered burning waste on the deck. He put out the burning waste while the casemate was filled with clouds of smoke, knowing that there was more powder there which might explode.

== See also ==
- List of Medal of Honor recipients
- List of Medal of Honor recipients for World War I
