= William S. Cronan =

United States Navy Medal of Honor recipient (1883–1959)

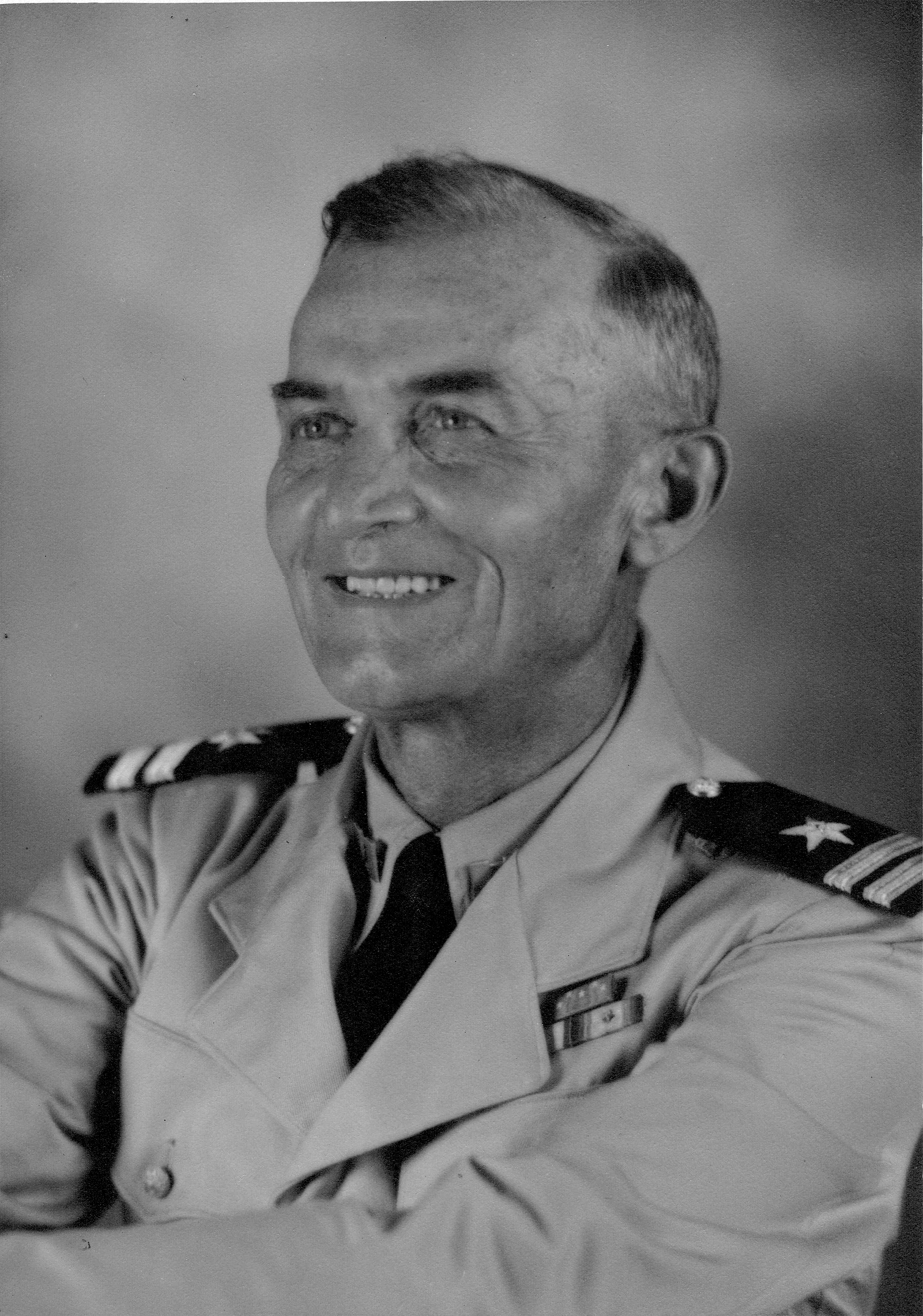
- LCDR William S. Cronan (then LT, in the 1930s)
- Born: October 23, 1883; Chicago, Illinois, US
- Died: October 22, 1959 (aged 75)
- Burial place: Fort Rosecrans National Cemetery
- Military career
- Allegiance: United States
- Branch: United States Navy
- Rank: Lieutenant commander
- Unit: USS Bennington (PG-4)
- Awards: Medal of Honor

William "Willie" S. Cronan (October 23, 1883 – October 22, 1959) was a boatswain's mate serving in the United States Navy during the first half of the twentieth century who was awarded the Medal of Honor for peacetime bravery in 1906.

== Biography ==
Lt. Cmdr. William S. Cronan, USN (then Chief Gunner), 1910s

Cronan was born October 23, 1883, in Chicago, Illinois, and after joining the navy was stationed aboard the USS Bennington (PG-4) as a boatswain's mate. On July 21, 1905, the USS Bennington was in San Diego, California, when a boiler exploded. The combination of the explosion and the scalding steam killed a number of men outright and left others mortally wounded; the final death toll was one officer, Ensign Newman K. Perry and sixty-five men, making it one of the U.S. Navy's worst peacetime disasters. Nearly all of the forty-six who survived had an injury of some sort. Wounded himself, Cronan saved three of his shipmates from drowning, the third, after Cronan escaped from triage. For his actions Boatswain's Mate Cronan was awarded the peacetime Medal on January 5, 1906, by President Theodore Roosevelt.

Cronan remained in the Navy after receiving the Medal of Honor. He was promoted to the warrant officer rank of gunner in 1909 and to chief gunner in 1915. During World War I, he was temporarily commissioned as a lieutenant (junior grade) but revered to Chief Gunner after the war. During World War II, he was promoted to lieutenant in 1942 and to lieutenant commander in 1944. He retired with the rank of lieutenant commander at the end of 1946, having completed almost 45 years of service.

He died October 22, 1959, and is buried in Fort Rosecrans National Cemetery in San Diego, California.

== Medal of Honor citation ==
Rank and organization: Boatswain's Mate, U.S. Navy. Born: 23 October 1883, Chicago, Ill. Accredited to: Illinois. G.O. No.: 13, 5 January 1906.

Citation:

Serving on board the U.S.S. Bennington, for extraordinary heroism displayed at the time of the explosion of a boiler of that vessel at San Diego, Calif., 21 July 1905.

== Dates of rank ==
- Enlisted – 30 January 1902
- Gunner – 16 January 1909
- Chief gunner – 16 January 1915
- Lieutenant (junior grade) – 1 January 1918
- Lieutenant – 15 June 1942
- Lieutenant commander – 1 April 1944
- Retired – 31 December 1946

== Awards ==
- Medal of Honor
- Philippine Campaign Medal
- World War I Victory Medal
- American Defense Service Medal
- American Campaign Medal
- World War II Victory Medal

== See also ==
- List of Medal of Honor recipients during Peacetime
