= List of Medal of Honor recipients in non-combat incidents =

Prior to 1963, the Navy version of the Medal of Honor could be awarded for actions not involving direct combat with "an enemy of the United States" or "opposing foreign force [s]" (actions against a party in which the U.S. is not directly engaged in war with). At other times, the Medal of Honor was awarded to Army officers by special bills of relief that waived public law requirements, such as for Adolphus Greely, and Charles Lindbergh. 204 men earned the medal in this way. The vast majority of the non-combat medals were awarded to members of the United States Navy for their actions during boiler explosions, man-overboard incidents, and other hazards of naval service. The list includes 10 Navy officers and men who earned the Medal of Honor for non-combat actions during the First World War and one who received it during World War II.

After World War I, the Department of the Navy decided to separate the Medal of Honor into two versions, one for combat and one for non-combat. This was an attempt to circumvent the requirement enacted in 1919 that recipients participate "in action involving actual conflict with the enemy," which would have foreclosed non-combat awards. By treating the 1919 Medal of Honor--called the "Tiffany Cross" Medal of Honor--as a separate award from its Civil War counterpart, this allowed the Department of the Navy to claim that it was not literally in violation of the 1919 law. In 1942, in response to a lawsuit, the Department of the Navy requested an amendment to expressly allow noncombat awards of the Medal of Honor. When the amendment passed, the Department of the Navy returned to using only the original 1862 inverted 5-point star design and retired the Tiffany Cross. With the passage of Public Law 88–77 on July 25, 1963, the requirements for the Medal of Honor were standardized among all the services, requiring that a recipient had "distinguished himself conspicuously by gallantry and intrepidity at the risk of his life above and beyond the call of duty." The last award of the Medal of Honor for valor not in combat was Francis P. Hammerberg, a United States Navy diver who received the Medal of Honor posthumously for rescuing two fellow divers at Pearl Harbor in the then Territory of Hawaii. He lost his life during rescue operations on February 17, 1945.

Given in the list below are the place and date of each recipient's Medal of Honor action, as well as their rank at the time of the action. A posthumous award is denoted by an asterisk after the recipient's name.

== Medal of Honor ==
The Medal of Honor was created during the American Civil War and is the highest military decoration presented by the United States to a member of its armed forces. Currently, the recipient must have distinguished themselves at the risk of their own life above and beyond the call of duty in action against "an enemy of the United States" or "an opposing foreign force." Due to the nature of this medal, it is commonly presented posthumously. A Medal of Honor in non-combat has not been presented since 1945.

== List of recipients ==
This with the * indicates that the Medal of Honor was awarded posthumously

Note: Notes in quotations are derived or are copied from the official Medal of Honor citation

Image	Name	Service	Rank	Place of action	Date of action	Notes
—	William Ahern	Navy	Watertender	USS Puritan (BM-1)	Jul 1, 1897	For lifesaving heroism during boiler malfunction
—	William Anderson	Navy	Coxswain	USS Powhatan	Jun 28, 1878	For rescuing from drowning W. H. Moffatt, First Class Boy
Illustration with the head of a black sailor at left, a star-shaped medal on a ribbon at right, a ship next to two men in the water, one holding the other, in the background and the words "Daniel Atkins, 1892" at bottom.	Daniel Atkins	Navy	Ship's Cook First Class	USS Cushing (TB-1)	Feb 11, 1898	For attempting to save from drowning, Ensign Joseph C. Breckenridge
—	John F. Auer	Navy	Ordinary Seaman Apprentice	USS Lancaster, Marseille, France	Nov 20, 1883	For rescuing a drowning French boy, who had fallen from a pier
Head and shoulders of a white man wearing a dark jacket with four medals on the left breast and a star-shaped medal hanging from a ribbon around his neck.	William Badders	Navy	Chief Machinist's Mate	wreck site of USS Squalus (SS-192)	May 23, 1939	For his actions as a diver in rescuing the crew of the sunken USS Squalus
—	Edward Barrett	Navy	Fireman Second Class	USS Alaska, Callao Bay, Peru	Sep 14, 1881	Saved USS Alaska from catastrophe by preventing boiler explosion
—	Richard Bates	Navy	Seaman	off Eastport, Maine	May 10, 1866	For rescuing from drowning, James Rose and John Russell, seamen of USS Winooski
—	Frederick Behne	Navy	Fireman First Class	USS Iowa (BB-4)	Jan 25, 1905	Extraordinary heroism saving ship after boiler explosion
—	Heinrich Behnke	Navy	Seaman First Class	USS Iowa (BB-4)	Jan 25, 1905	Extraordinary heroism saving ship after boiler explosion
—	William H. Belpitt	Navy	Captain of the Afterguard	USS Monocacy, Fuzhou, China	Oct 7, 1884	For rescuing from drowning a Chinese man, whose canoe had capsized
Profile of a white man wearing a thick coat and tight-fitting leather aviator's cap, strapped under the chin, with goggles pushed up onto his forehead.	Floyd Bennett	Navy	Machinist	over the Arctic	May 9, 1926	For his part in what was thought to be the first successful heavier-than-air flight to the North Pole and back
—	James Benson	Navy	Seaman	USS Ossipee	Jun 20, 1872	For attempting to save from drowning, Landsman John K. Smith
—	Ernest H. Bjorkman	Navy	Ordinary Seaman	USS Leyden	Jan 21, 1903	For heroism during the sinking of his ship
A young white man in a seaman uniform decorated with a star-shaped medal on the left breast, looking off into the distance.	Edward W. Boers	Navy	Seaman	USS Bennington (PG-4), San Diego, California	Jul 21, 1905	Extraordinary heroism, while minimizing loss of life, and material damage while saving his ship, after a boiler explosion
—	Robert E. Bonney	Navy	Chief Watertender	USS Hopkins (DD-6)	Feb 14, 1910	For heroism during an accident to a ship's boiler
—	Alexander Bradley (Note: Bradley was also known as "Neil Bonner".)	Navy	Landsman	USS Wachusett, off Cowes, England	Aug 7, 1872	For attempting to save from drowning Landsman Philip Cassidy of USS Wabash
	Willis Winter Bradley, Jr.	Navy	Lieutenant	USS Pittsburgh en route to Buenos Aires, Argentina	Jul 23, 1917	Entered a room containing explosives and extinguished a fire after an accidental detonation
Head and shoulders of a white man wearing a flat sailor's cap, a sailor suit with scarf tied around the neck under the collar, and a star-shaped medal hanging from a ribbon around his neck.	Henry Breault	Navy	Torpedoman's Mate Second Class	USS O-5 (SS-66)	Oct 28, 1923	For rescuing another sailor when submarine O-5 sank
Headshot taken from the George A Breeman memorial in Passaic, New Jersey	George Breeman	Navy	Seaman	USS Kearsarge (BB-5)	Apr 13, 1906	For actions after the accidental ignition of gunpowder
—	Patrick F. Bresnahan	Navy	Watertender	USS Iowa (BB-4)	Jan 25, 1905	Extraordinary heroism saving ship after boiler explosion
—	George F. Brock	Navy	Carpenter's Mate Second Class	USS Bennington (PG-4), San Diego, California	Jul 21, 1905	For extraordinary heroism when boiler exploded on ship
—	John Brown	Navy	Captain of the Afterguard	off Eastport, Maine	May 10, 1866	For rescuing from drowning James Rose and John Russell, seamen of USS Winooski
—	David M. Buchanan	Navy	Apprentice	USS Saratoga, off Battery, New York Harbor	Jul 15, 1879	Saved Apprentice Robert Lee Robey from drowning at risk of his own life
—	Thomas Burke	Navy	Seaman	off Eastport, Maine	May 10, 1866	For rescuing from drowning James Rose and John Russell, seamen of USS Winooski
	Richard E. Byrd, Jr.	Navy	Commander	over the Arctic	May 9, 1926	For leading what was thought to be the first successful heavier-than-air flight to the North Pole and back
—	Thomas Cahey	Navy	Seaman	USS Petrel (PG-2)	Mar 31, 1901	Risked his life to save others from an on-board fire
Head of a young man with full cheeks wearing a military peaked cap and looking off into the distance.	Tedford H. Cann	Navy	Seaman	USS May	Nov 5, 1917	Dove into a flooded compartment to find and plug a leak which threatened his ship
	James Carey	Navy	Seaman	USS Huron	1870	For saving 3 shipmates from drowning
Head and shoulders of a young white man with neatly combed hair wearing a dark jacket with two columns of buttons down the chest and an anchor emblem on each side of the upright collar.	Robert W. Cary	Navy	Ensign	USS San Diego (CA-6)	Jan 21, 1915	Saved 3 men's lives after boiler explosion, then led effort to prevent further boiler explosion
—	August Chandron	Navy	Seaman Apprentice Second Class	USS Quinnebaug, Alexandria, Egypt	Nov 21, 1885	For rescuing from drowning Ordinary Seaman William Evans
Head of a white man with dark, slicked-back hair wearing a white sailor's cap pushed up on his forehead and a sailor suit with a dark scarf tied around the neck.	George R. Cholister*	Navy	Boatswain's Mate First Class	USS Trenton (CL-11)	Oct 20, 1924	Died of burns suffered while attempting to stifle a fatal munitions fire in forward gun mount
—	Edward A. Clary	Navy	Watertender	USS Hopkins (DD-6)	Feb 14, 1910	Extraordinary heroism in line of duty during accident to ship's boiler
—	John J. Clausey	Navy	Chief Gunner's Mate	USS Bennington (PG-4), San Diego, California	Jul 21, 1905	For extraordinary heroism when boiler exploded on ship
—	Michael Connolly	Navy	Ordinary Seaman	USS Plymouth, Halifax Harbour, Nova Scotia	Aug 7, 1876	For rescuing a citizen from drowning
—	Demetri Corahorgi	Navy	Fireman First Class	USS Iowa (BB-4)	Jan 25, 1905	Extraordinary heroism saving ship after boiler explosion
—	William Corey	Navy	Landsman	USS Plymouth, Navy Yard, New York	Jul 26, 1876	Heroic attempt to save life of shipmate fallen overboard from aloft
Head and shoulders of a white man with a neatly trimmed mustache wearing a military jacket with shoulder boards and two columns of buttons down the chest.	William M. Corry, Jr.*	Navy	Lieutenant Commander	near Hartford, Connecticut	Oct 2, 1920	For attempting to rescue a fellow officer from a burning plane; died from burns four days later
—	John Costello	Navy	Ordinary Seaman	USS Hartford, Philadelphia, Pennsylvania	Jul 16, 1876	For rescuing from drowning a landsman of USS Hartford
—	Henry C. Courtney	Navy	Seaman	USS Portsmouth, Washington Navy Yard	Feb 7, 1882	For rescuing from drowning Charles Taliaferro, Jack-of-the-Dust
	Jesse W. Covington	Navy	Ship's Cook Third class	USS Stewart	Apr 17, 1918	Dove overboard and rescued a man who was surrounded by boxes of explosives
—	Robert E. Cox	Navy	Chief Gunner's Mate	USS Missouri, off Pensacola, Florida	Apr 13, 1904	For extinguishing munitions fire aboard ship, preventing its loss
—	Thomas Cramen	Navy	Boatswain's Mate	USS Portsmouth, Washington Navy Yard	Feb 7, 1882	For rescuing from drowning Charles Taliaferro, Jack-of-the-Dust
Head and torso of a man with a mustache and dark, thinning hair wearing a dark jacket with stripes on the upper sleeve, two round medals on the left breast, and a star-shaped medal hanging from a ribbon around his neck.	Orson L. Crandall	Navy	Chief Boatswain's Mate	wreck site of USS Squalus (SS-192)	May 23, 1939	For his actions as a diver in rescuing the crew of the sunken USS Squalus
—	William J. Creelman	Navy	Landsman	USS Maine (ACR-1)	Feb 1, 1897	Heroic attempt to save life at sea
	Frank W. Crilley	Navy	Chief Gunner's Mate	wreck site of USS F-4 (SS-23), off Honolulu, Hawaii	Apr 17, 1915	For rescuing a fellow diver who had become tangled in the wreckage and trapped underwater
—	Willie Cronan	Navy	Boatswain's Mate	USS Bennington (PG-4), San Diego, California	Jul 21, 1905	Bravery shown during ship's boiler explosion
—	George W. Cutter	Navy	Landsman	USS Powhatan, Norfolk, Virginia	May 27, 1872	For assisting in rescuing a shipmate from drowning
—	John Davis	Navy	Ordinary Seaman	USS Trenton, Toulon, France	Feb 1, 1881	For rescuing from drowning Coxswain Augustus Ohlensen
—	Joseph H. Davis	Navy	Landsman	USS Dale, off wharf at Norfolk, Virginia	Jan 22, 1886	For rescuing from drowning Ordinary Seaman John Norman
—	Raymond E. Davis	Navy	Quartermaster Third Class	USS Bennington (PG-4), San Diego, California	Jul 21, 1905	For extraordinary heroism when boiler exploded aboard ship
—	John Dempsey	Navy	Seaman	USS Kearsarge, Shanghai, China	Jan 23, 1875	Gallantly rescued shipmate from drowning
—	Michael Deneef	Navy	Captain of the Top	USS Swatara, Para, Brazil	Dec 1, 1875	Leaped overboard and saved shipmate from drowning
—	Austin Denham	Navy	Seaman	USS Kansas, near Greytown, Nicaragua	Apr 12, 1872	Preventing further loss of life during mass drowning
Head of a young white man with hair combed back at the top and short on the sides, wearing a dark jacket with two columns of buttons down the chest and an anchor emblem on the upright collar.	Henry C. Drexler*	Navy	Ensign	USS Trenton (CL-11)	Oct 20, 1924	Died of burns while attempting to stifle a fatal munitions fire in forward gun mount
—	Frank Du Moulin	Navy	Apprentice	USS Sabine, New London Harbor	Sep 5, 1867	For jumping overboard and saving Apprentice D'Orsay from drowning
Head and shoulders of a smiling white man wearing a dark peaked cap with the letters "U.S.N" on the front and a dark jacket with three medals on the left breast and a star-shaped medal hanging from a ribbon around his neck.	Thomas Eadie	Navy	Chief Gunner's Mate	USS S-4 (SS-109) wreck site, off Provincetown, Massachusetts	Dec 18, 1927	For rescuing a fellow diver who had become trapped underwater
Head and shoulders of a white man with a handlebar mustache, wearing a peaked cap and a dark jacket with two rows of ribbon bars on the left breast. Several other men in similar clothing can be seen behind him.	Walter A. Edwards	Navy	Lieutenant Commander	USS Bainbridge (DD-246), Sea of Marmora, Turkey	Dec 16, 1922	For leading the rescue of passengers on the French military transport Vinh-Long
—	Henry A. Eilers	Navy	Gunner's Mate	USS Philadelphia (C-4), Fort McHenry, Baltimore, Maryland	Sep 17, 1892	Stamping out burning particles of prematurely exploded cartridge in powder magazine
—	Walter Elmore	Navy	Landsman	USS Gettysburg	Oct 1, 1878	For saving from drowning Landsman Wallace Febrey
—	John Enright	Navy	Landsman	USS Ranger, off Ensenada, Mexico	Jan 18, 1886	Jumping overboard, Davis rescued Seamen John Bell and George Svensson from drowning
—	John Everetts	Navy	Gunner's Mate Third Class	USS Cushing (TB-1)	Feb 11, 1898	For attempting to save from drowning Ensign Joseph C. Breckenridge
—	Harry Delmar Fadden	Navy	Coxswain	USS Adams	Jun 30, 1903	For rescuing O.C. Hawthorne, Landsman for training, from drowning
—	Isaac L. Fasseur	Navy	Ordinary Seaman	USS Lackawanna, Callao, Peru	Jun 13, 1884	For rescuing from drowning William Cruise
—	John Flannagan	Navy	Boatswain's Mate	USS Supply	Oct 26, 1878	For rescuing from drowning Seaman David Walsh
—	Edward Floyd	Navy	Boilermaker	USS Iowa (BB-4)	Jan 25, 1905	Extraordinary heroism saving ship after boiler explosion
—	Christopher Fowler	Navy	Quartermaster	USS Fortune, Point Zapotitlan, Mexico	May 11, 1874	Displayed valorous conduct when ship's boat capsized, drowning part of crew
—	Emil Fredericksen	Navy	Watertender	USS Bennington (PG-4), San Diego, California	Jul 21, 1905	For extraordinary heroism when boiler exploded on ship
—	Charles Gidding (Note: Gidding's surname is sometimes given as "Giddings".)	Navy	Seaman	USS Plymouth, Navy Yard, New York	Jul 26, 1876	For trying to rescue a shipmate from drowning
—	Matthew Gillick	Navy	Boatswain's Mate	USS Lancaster, Marseille, France	Nov 20, 1883	For rescuing from drowning a French boy who had fallen from a pier
—	Alphonse Girandy	Navy	Seaman	USS Petrel (PG-2)	Mar 31, 1901	For courage in firefighting efforts
—	William H. Gowan	Navy	Boatswain's Mate	Coquimbo, Chile	Jan 20, 1909	Bravery displayed by him during a fire
	Ora Graves	Navy	Seaman	USS Pittsburgh en route to Buenos Aires, Argentina	Jul 23, 1917	Extinguished a fire after an accidental explosion
—	Rade Grbitch	Navy	Seaman	USS Bennington (PG-4), San Diego, California	Jul 21, 1905	For extraordinary heroism when boiler exploded aboard ship
Profile of an older white man with a full, bushy beard and wire-framed glasses wearing a military jacket with shoulder boards, many medals on the left breast, and a strap running diagonally across the chest.	Adolphus W. Greely	Army	Major General	various	Jul 26, 1861 – Mar 27, 1908	For his lifetime of service
Head and shoulders of a dark-haired white man with a thin, drooping mustache, wearing an unbuttoned dark jacket over a checkered shirt.	William Halford	Navy	Coxswain	Pacific Ocean	Oct 1, 1870	Sailed 31 days in small boat to Hawaii to fetch rescuers to his marooned shipmates of USS Saginaw stranded near Midway Island.
—	Luovi Halling	Navy	Boatswain's Mate First Class	USS Missouri	Sep 15, 1904	For attempting to rescue a shipmate from drowning
	Francis Hammerberg*	Navy	Boatswain's Mate Second Class	Pearl Harbor Navy Yard	Feb 17, 1945	Died while rescuing two other divers from the wreckage of a sunken LST at Pearl Harbor. Hammerberg was the last person to receive the Medal of Honor for a non-combat action.
—	John Handran	Navy	Seaman	USS Franklin, Lisbon, Portugal	Jan 9, 1876	For rescuing a shipmate from drowning
—	David Harrington	Navy	Fireman First Class	USS Tallapoosa	Aug 21, 1884	Remained in engine room of his sinking ship until waist deep water extinguished boiler fires, then opened safety valves
—	John Hayden	Navy	Apprentice	USS Saratoga, off the Battery, New York Harbor	Jul 15, 1879	For assisting in the rescue from drowning of R. L. Robey
—	John H. Helms	Marine Corps	Sergeant	USS Chicago, Montevideo, Uruguay	Jan 10, 1901	For rescuing a shipmate from drowning
—	Frank E. Hill	Navy	Ship's Cook First Class	USS Bennington (PG-4), San Diego, California	Jul 21, 1905	For extraordinary heroism when boiler exploded on ship
—	George Hill	Navy	Chief Quarter Gunner	USS Kansas, near Greytown, Nicaragua	Apr 12, 1872	Preventing further loss of life during mass drowning
—	William L. Hill	Navy	Captain of the Top	USS Minnesota, Newport, Rhode Island	Jun 22, 1881	For rescuing from drowning William Mulcahy, Third Class Boy
—	George Holt	Navy	Quarter Gunner	USS Plymouth, Hamburg Harbor	Jul 3, 1871	For rescuing from drowning one of a party who was thrown from a shore boat
	August Holtz	Navy	Chief Watertender	USS North Dakota (BB-29)	Sep 8, 1910	For heroism in fighting fire on USS North Dakota
—	James Horton	Navy	Captain of the Top	USS Constitution	Feb 13, 1879	For going over the stern during a heavy gale and cutting the fastenings of the ship's rudder chains
Head of a white man with a very thin mustache, wearing a dark jacket over a white shirt and dark tie and a white peaked cap with an eagle-shield-anchor emblem on the front.	William R. Huber	Navy	Machinist's Mate	USS Bruce (DD-329), Naval Shipyard, Norfolk, Virginia	Jun 11, 1928	Risked his life and suffered severe burns rescuing Charles Bryan from steam-filled boiler room after accident
Head and shoulders of a white man with wavy hair, wearing a white military jacket with shoulder boards and a winged pin on the left breast.	Carlton B. Hutchins*	Navy	Lieutenant	off the coast of southern California	Feb 2, 1938	Remained at controls of damaged seaplane, thereby saving lives of aircrew members
—	Johannes J. Johannessen	Navy	Chief Watertender	USS Iowa (BB-4)	Jan 25, 1905	Extraordinary heroism saving ship after boiler explosion
—	John Johnson	Navy	Seaman	USS Kansas, near Greytown, Nicaragua	Apr 12, 1872	Preventing further loss of life during mass drowning
—	William Johnson	Navy	Cooper	USS Adams, Navy Yard, Mare Island, California	Nov 14, 1879	For rescuing from drowning Daniel W. Kloppen, a workman
Head of a white man with hair parted and combed back, wearing a dark jacket over a white shirt and dark tie.	Claud Ashton Jones	Navy	Commander	USS Memphis (CA-10), off Santo Domingo City, Santo Domingo	Aug 29, 1916	Saved lives of crew of USS Memphis from destruction by a tsunami
—	Thomas Kersey	Navy	Ordinary Seaman	USS Plymouth, Navy Yard, New York	Jul 26, 1876	For rescuing a shipmate from drowning
—	Hugh King	Navy	Ordinary Seaman	USS Iroquois, Delaware River	Sep 7, 1871	For rescuing one of the crew of USS Iroquois from drowning
	John King	Navy	Watertender	USS Salem (CL-3)	Sep 13, 1909	For heroism during a boiler accident
—	John King	Navy	Watertender	USS Vicksburg (PG-11)	May 29, 1901	For heroism during a boiler accident; one of only 19 two-time Medal of Honor recipients
—	Robert Klein	Navy	Chief Carpenter's Mate	USS Raleigh (C-8)	Jan 25, 1904	For saving shipmates succumbing to poisonous fumes
Head of a white man wearing a dark suit and bow tie. To the lower right of the oval-shaped portrait is an illustration of a shield covered with stars and stripes, like the American flag, and a ribbon tied around the shield.	Patrick J. Kyle	Navy	Landsman	USS Quinnebaug, Port Mahon, Minorca	Mar 13, 1879	For rescuing a shipmate from drowning
—	John Lafferty	Navy	Fireman First Class	USS Alaska, Callao Bay, Peru	Sep 14, 1881	Second award; previously received a Medal of Honor for actions during the Civil War
—	Thomas Lakin	Navy	Seaman	USS Narragansett, Navy Yard, Mare Island, California	Nov 1, 1874	For rescuing two shipmates from drowning
—	Emile Lejeune	Navy	Seaman	USS Plymouth, Port Royal, South Carolina	Jun 6, 1876	For rescuing a citizen from drowning
	Charles Lindbergh	Air Corps	Captain	from New York City to Paris, France	May 20, 1927 – May 21, 1927	For flying the first solo non-stop flight across the Atlantic Ocean
	Harry Lipscomb	Navy	Watertender	USS North Dakota (BB-29)	Sep 8, 1910	For heroism in fighting fire aboard his ship
—	George Low	Navy	Seaman	USS Tennessee, New Orleans, Louisiana	Feb 15, 1881	For rescuing from drowning N. P. Petersen, Gunner's Mate
—	John Lucy	Navy	Second Class Boy	USS Minnesota, Castle Garden, New York	Jul 9, 1876	For heroic conduct aboard USS Minnesota during Castle Garden immigration center fire
Head and shoulders of a man wearing a military jacket with a tie and high-collared white shirt underneath. A medal hangs from around his neck and his hat, a peaked cap, bears an anchor-shaped emblem with the letters "USN".	John MacKenzie	Navy	Chief Boatswain's Mate	USS Remlik (SP-157) in the Bay of Biscay	Dec 17, 1917	Secured a live depth charge
—	Edward Maddin	Navy	Ordinary Seaman	USS Franklin, Lisbon, Portugal	Jan 9, 1876	For rescuing a shipmate from drowning
—	John W. Magee	Navy	Fireman Second Class	USS Tallapoosa	Aug 21, 1884	Remained on duty in fireroom until rising waters extinguished boilers
—	Henry J. Manning	Navy	Quartermaster	USS New Hampshire, off Coasters Harbor Island, near Newport, Rhode Island	Jan 4, 1882	For attempting to rescue from drowning Jabez Smith, Second Class Musician
—	Joseph Matthews	Navy	Captain of the Top	USS Constitution	Feb 13, 1879	For going over the stern during a heavy gale and cutting the fastenings of the ship's rudder chains
—	John McCarton	Navy	Ship's Printer	USS New Hampshire, off Coasters Harbor Island, near Newport, Rhode Island	Jan 4, 1882	For attempting to rescue from drowning Jabez Smith, Second Class Musician
Head and shoulders of a white man with short bristly hair wearing a dark jacket with one round medal pinned to the left breast and a star-shaped medal hanging from a ribbon around his neck.	James H. McDonald	Navy	Chief Metalsmith	wreck site of USS Squalus (SS-192)	May 23, 1939	For his actions as a diver in rescuing the crew of the sunken USS Squalus
	Patrick McGunigal	Navy	Shipfitter First class	USS Huntington	Sep 17, 1917	Rescued the pilot of a crashed observation balloon
Head and shoulders of a white man with combed-back hair wearing a dark jacket with stripes on the upper sleeve, one round medal pinned to the left breast, and a star-shaped medal hanging from a ribbon around his neck.	John Mihalowski	Navy	Torpedoman First Class	wreck site of USS Squalus (SS-192)	May 23, 1939	For his actions as a diver in rescuing the crew of the sunken USS Squalus
—	Hugh Miller	Navy	Boatswain's Mate	USS Quinnebaug, Alexandria, Egypt	Nov 21, 1885	For assisting in rescuing a shipmate from drowning
—	John Millmore	Navy	Ordinary Seaman	USS Essex, Monrovia, Liberia	Oct 31, 1877	For rescuing from drowning Ordinary Seaman John W. Powers
—	Thomas Mitchell	Navy	Landsman	USS Richmond, Shanghai, China	Nov 17, 1879	For rescuing from drowning First Class Boy M. F. Caulan
A man sitting cross-legged on a wooden deck, wearing a plain white suit and a white peaked cap with black visor. The number "22" is written over his image, and around him are other seated men with numbers similarly written over them.	Mons Monssen	Navy	Chief Gunner's Mate	USS Missouri	Apr 13, 1904	Entered munitions magazine to extinguish fire with hand thrown water, then by hose
—	Francis Moore	Navy	Boatswain's Mate	USS Portsmouth, Washington Navy Yard	Jan 23, 1882	For attempting to rescue from drowning Thomas Duncan, carpenter and calker
—	Philip Moore	Navy	Seaman	USS Trenton, Genoa, Italy	Sep 21, 1880	For rescuing from drowning Ordinary Seaman Hans Paulsen
—	John Morris	Marine Corps	Corporal	USS Lancaster, Villefranche, France	Dec 25, 1881	For rescuing from drowning Ordinary Seaman Robert Blizzard
—	William Morse	Navy	Seaman	USS Shenandoah, Rio de Janeiro, Brazil	Sep 19, 1880	For rescuing from drowning First Class Fireman James Grady
—	Hugh P. Mullin	Navy	Seaman	USS Texas, off Hampton Roads, Virginia	Nov 11, 1899	For rescuing from drowning Apprentice Second Class Alfred Kosminski
—	Oscar F. Nelson	Navy	Machinist's Mate First Class	USS Bennington (PG-4), San Diego, California	Jul 21, 1905	For extraordinary heroism when boiler exploded aboard ship
Illustration with the head of a black sailor at left, a star-shaped medal on a ribbon at right, a ship with a man jumping overboard and another man in the water in the background, and the words "Joseph Noil, 1872" at bottom.	Joseph B. Noil	Navy	Seaman	USS Powhatan, Norfolk, Virginia	Dec 26, 1872	For saving Boatswain J. C. Walton from drowning
—	Isadore Nordstrom (Note: Nordstrom's first name is spelled "Isidor" on the official citation.)	Navy	Chief Boatswain's Mate	USS Kearsarge (BB-5)	Apr 13, 1906	For rescuing injured after munitions fire in forward turret
—	J. W. Norris	Navy	Landsman	USS Jamestown, New York Navy Yard	Dec 20, 1883	For rescuing A. A. George from drowning
—	James F. O'Conner	Navy	Landsman	USS Jean Sands, opposite the Norfolk Navy Yard	Jun 15, 1880	For rescuing from drowning a young girl who had fallen overboard
—	John O'Neal	Navy	Boatswain's Mate	USS Kansas, near Greytown, Nicaragua	Apr 12, 1872	Preventing further loss of life during mass drowning
—	August Ohmsen	Navy	Master-at-Arms	USS Tallapoosa	Aug 21, 1884	For lifesaving efforts during sinking of USS Tallapoosa
	Francis E. Ormsbee, Jr.	Navy	Chief Machinist's Mate	near the Naval Air Station, Pensacola, Florida	Sep 25, 1918	Rescued the gunner of a downed plane, tried unsuccessfully to rescue the pilot
—	John Osborne	Navy	Seaman	USS Juniata (1862), Philadelphia, Pennsylvania	Aug 21, 1876	For rescuing from drowning an enlisted boy of USS Juniata
—	Christian Osepins	Navy	Seaman	USS Fortune, Hampton Roads, Virginia	May 7, 1882	For rescuing from drowning Gunner's Mate James Walters
—	Alexander Parker	Navy	Boatswain's Mate	Mare Island Naval Shipyard	Jul 25, 1876	For attempting to save a shipmate from drowning
—	Alexander Peters	Navy	Boatswain's Mate First Class	USS Missouri	Sep 15, 1904	For attempting to rescue a shipmate from drowning
—	Louis F. Pfeifer	Marine Corps	Private	USS Petrel (PG-2)	Mar 31, 1901	"...for heroism and gallantry, fearlessly exposing his own life to danger for the saving of the others on the occasion of the fire on board that vessel." Served as Louis F. Theis during first enlistment.
—	Richard Pile	Navy	Ordinary Seaman	USS Kansas, near Greytown, Nicaragua	Apr 12, 1872	Preventing further loss of life during mass drowning
—	Joseph Quick	Navy	Coxswain	Yokohama, Japan	Apr 27, 1902	For rescuing a shipmate from drowning
—	Patrick Regan	Navy	Ordinary Seaman	USS Pensacola, harbor of Coquimbo, Chile	Jul 30, 1873	For rescuing a shipmate from drowning
	Patrick Reid	Navy	Chief Watertender	USS North Dakota (BB-29)	Sep 8, 1910	For heroism in fighting fire on his ship
	Charles C. Roberts	Navy	Machinist's Mate First Class	USS North Dakota (BB-29)	Sep 8, 1910	For heroism in fighting fire on his ship
—	John Robinson	Navy	Captain of the Hold	Pensacola Bay, Florida	Jan 19, 1867	Swam ashore through heavy gale trailing rescue line needed to resupply ship so it could raise steam and avoid stranding
—	Thomas Robinson	Navy	Captain of the Afterguard	off New Orleans, Louisiana	Jul 15, 1866	For efforts to save from drowning Wellington Brocar, Landsman, of USS Tallapoosa
—	Johannes Rouning	Navy	Ordinary Seaman	USS Fortune, Hampton Roads, Virginia	May 7, 1882	For rescuing from drowning Gunner's Mate James Walters
	George W. Rud*	Navy	Chief Machinist's Mate	USS Memphis (CA-10), off Santo Domingo City, Santo Domingo	Aug 29, 1916	Scalded to death at his engine room duty while a tsunami was destroying his ship
—	John Russell	Navy	Seaman	USS Trenton, Genoa, Italy	Sep 21, 1880	For rescuing from drowning Ordinary Seaman Hans Paulsen
—	Richard Ryan	Navy	Ordinary Seaman	USS Hartford, Norfolk, Virginia	Mar 4, 1876	For rescuing a shipmate from drowning
Profile of a young white man with hair thick on top and short at the sides, wearing a dark jacket with two columns of buttons down the chest and an anchor emblem on the side of the upright collar.	Thomas J. Ryan	Navy	Ensign	Yokohama, Japan	Sep 1, 1923	For rescuing a woman from the burning Grand Hotel, following an earthquake
—	William Sadler	Navy	Captain of the Top	USS Saratoga, off Coasters Harbor Island, Rhode Island	Jun 25, 1881	For rescuing from drowning Second Class Boy Frank Gallagher
—	Isaac Sapp (Note: Sapp's first name is spelled "Isacc" on the official citation.)	Navy	Seaman	USS Shenandoah, Villefranche, France	Dec 15, 1871	For assisting in saving from drowning Seaman Charles Prince
—	Charles S. Schepke	Navy	Gunner's Mate First Class	USS Missouri	Apr 13, 1904	For extinguishing munitions fire aboard ship, preventing its loss
Head of a man wearing a dark jacket and tie and a peaked cap with an anchor and "USN" emblem on the front.	Oscar Schmidt, Jr.	Navy	Chief Gunner's Mate	USS Chestnut Hill	Oct 9, 1918	Rescued a wounded man from the water and attempted to rescue another
Otto Schmidt navy photo	Otto D. Schmidt	Navy	Seaman	USS Bennington (PG-4), San Diego, California	Jul 21, 1905	For extraordinary heroism when boiler exploded aboard ship
—	William S. Shacklette	Navy	Hospital Steward	USS Bennington (PG-4), San Diego, California	Jul 21, 1905	Bravery shown during ship's boiler explosion
—	Patrick Shanahan	Navy	Chief Boatswain's Mate	USS Alliance	May 28, 1899	For rescuing from drowning Quartermaster First Class William Steven
—	John O. Siegel	Navy	Boatswain's Mate Second Class	Mohawk (YT-17)	Nov 1, 1918	Rescued two men from a burning vessel before being trapped and collapsing from the smoke
—	Henry L. Simpson*	Navy	Fireman First Class	USS Essex, Monrovia, Liberia	Oct 31, 1877	For rescuing from drowning Ordinary Seaman John W. Powers
—	Albert J. Smith	Marine Corps	Private	Marine Barracks, Naval Air Station, Pensacola, Florida	Feb 11, 1921	For pulling a man from the wreckage of a crashed and burning seaplane
—	Eugene P. Smith	Navy	Chief Watertender	USS Decatur (DD-5)	Sep 9, 1915	For entering compartments immediately following an explosion and rescuing injured shipmates
—	James Smith	Navy	Seaman	USS Kansas, near Greytown, Nicaragua	Apr 12, 1872	Preventing further loss of life during mass drowning
—	John Smith	Navy	Seaman	USS Shenandoah, off Rio de Janeiro, Brazil	Sep 19, 1880	For rescuing from drowning First Class Fireman James Grady
—	Thomas Smith	Navy	Seaman	USS Enterprise, off Para, Brazil	Oct 1, 1878	For rescuing from drowning Coxswain William Kent
—	Wilhelm Smith	Navy	Gunner's Mate First Class	USS New York	Jan 24, 1916	For entering a compartment filled with gases and rescuing a shipmate
—	William E. Snyder	Navy	Chief Electrician	USS Birmingham (CL-2), Hampton Roads, Virginia	Jan 4, 1910	For rescuing from drowning Seaman G.H. Kephart
—	William B. Stacy	Navy	Seaman	harbor of Cape Haiten	before January 15, 1866	For rescuing from drowning one of the crew of USS Rhode Island (1861)
	Thomas Stanton	Navy	Chief Machinist's Mate	USS North Dakota (BB-29)	Sep 8, 1910	For heroism in fighting fire on USS North Dakota
—	James A. Stewart	Marine Corps	Corporal	USS Plymouth, harbor of Villefranche, France	Feb 1, 1872	For rescuing from drowning Midshipman Osterhaus
—	John Stokes	Navy	Chief Master-at-Arms	USS New York, off Jamaica	Mar 31, 1899	For helping rescue from drowning Watertender Peter Mahoney
—	Loddie Stupka	Navy	Fireman First Class	USS Leyden	Jan 21, 1903	For heroism during sinking of his ship
—	James F. Sullivan	Navy	Boatswain's Mate	USS New Hampshire, Newport, Rhode Island	Apr 21, 1882	For rescuing from drowning Third Class Boy Francis T. Price
—	Robert A. Sweeney	Navy	Ordinary Seaman	USS Kearsarge, at Hampton Roads, Virginia	Oct 26, 1881	For assisting in saving a shipmate from drowning
—	Robert A. Sweeney	Navy	Ordinary Seaman	USS Yantic at New York Navy Yard	Dec 20, 1883	For rescuing from drowning A. A. George
—	William Sweeney	Navy	Landsman	USS Jean Sands, opposite the Norfolk Navy Yard	Jun 15, 1880	For rescuing from drowning a young girl who had fallen overboard
—	John Taylor	Navy	Seaman	Brooklyn Navy Yard	Sep 9, 1865	For rescuing his commander from drowning
—	Richard H. Taylor	Navy	Quartermaster	USS Nipsic, Apia, Samoa	Mar 16, 1889	Displayed gallantry during hurricane
—	August P. Teytand	Navy	Quartermaster Third Class	USS Leyden	Jan 21, 1903	Heroism during sinking of his ship
—	James Thayer	Navy	Ship's Corporal	Naval Station Norfolk	Nov 16, 1879	For rescuing a shipmate from drowning
—	Henry Thompson	Navy	Seaman	Mare Island, California	Jun 27, 1878	For rescuing a man from drowning
—	Michael Thornton	Navy	Seaman	USS Leyden, near Boston, Massachusetts	Aug 26, 1881	For rescuing from drowning Landsman Michael Drennan
—	Paul Tobin	Navy	Landsman	USS Plymouth, Hamburg Harbor	Jul 3, 1871	For rescuing from drowning one of a party who was thrown from a shore boat
—	Telesforo Trinidad	Navy	Fireman Second Class	USS San Diego (CA-6)	Jan 21, 1915	Rescued R. E. Daly and another injured fireman from boiler explosion despite his own facial burns
—	James M. Trout	Navy	Fireman Second Class	USS Frolic, Montevideo	Apr 20, 1877	For attempting to save a shipmate from drowning
—	Jeremiah Troy	Navy	Chief Boatswain's Mate	USS New Hampshire, Newport, Rhode Island	Apr 21, 1882	For rescuing from drowning Third Class Boy Francis T. Price
—	Alexander H. Turvelin	Navy	Seaman	USS Trenton, Toulon, France	Feb 1, 1881	For rescuing from drowning Coxswain Augustus Ohlensen
—	Frank M. Upton	Navy	Ensign	USS Stewart	Apr 17, 1918	Dove overboard and rescued a man who was surrounded by boxes of explosives
	Michael Walsh	Navy	Chief Machinist	USS Leyden	Jan 21, 1903	For heroism during sinking of his ship
—	Albert Weisbogel	Navy	Captain of the Mizzen Top	USS Plymouth	Apr 27, 1876	For rescuing a shipmate from drowning
—	Albert Weisbogel	Navy	Captain of the Mizzen Top	USS Benicia	Jan 11, 1874	For rescuing a shipmate from drowning
—	Adam Weissel	Navy	Ship's Cook	USS Minnesota, Newport, Rhode Island	Aug 26, 1881	For rescuing from drowning Captain of the Forecastle C. Lorenze
	Karl Westa	Navy	Chief Machinist's Mate	USS North Dakota (BB-29)	Sep 8, 1910	For heroism in fighting fire on his ship
—	George H. Wheeler	Navy	Shipfitter First Class	Coquimbo, Chile	Jan 20, 1909	Extraordinary heroism during a fire
	Charles H. Willey	Navy	Machinist	USS Memphis (CA-10), off Santo Domingo City, Santo Domingo	Aug 29, 1916	Lifesaving actions during loss of his ship to a tsunami
—	Antonio Williams	Navy	Seaman	USS Huron	Nov 24, 1877	For courage and fidelity during loss of his ship
—	Henry Williams	Navy	Carpenter's Mate	USS Constitution	Feb 13, 1879	For going over the stern during a heavy gale and performing important carpenter's work upon the rudder
—	Louis Williams	Navy	Captain of the Hold	USS Lackawanna, Honolulu, Hawaii	Mar 16, 1883	For rescuing from drowning Landsman Thomas Moran
—	Louis Williams	Navy	Captain of the Hold	USS Lackawanna, Callao, Peru	Jun 13, 1884	For rescuing from drowning William Cruise
Illustration of a man with dark hair and wearing a sailor suit, standing on a platform attached to a ship's mast and pulling strenuously on a rope. The platform and mast are severely tilted to the right, and sails, pulleys and other ropes can be seen.	George Willis	Navy	Coxswain	USS Tigress, off the coast of Greenland	Sep 22, 1873	Singlehanded furled loose fore topgallant sail, preventing damage to ship
—	August Wilson	Navy	Boilermaker	USS Puritan (BM-1)	Jul 1, 1897	For lifesaving heroism during boiler malfunction
