= John Costello (Medal of Honor) =

United States Navy sailor (c. 1850–1887)

- Born: c. 1850; Rouses Point, New York, U.S.
- Died: April 11, 1887 (aged 36–37); Chelsea, Massachusetts, U.S.
- Burial place: Everett, Massachusetts, US
- Military career
- Allegiance: United States
- Branch: United States Navy
- Rank: Ordinary Seaman
- Unit: USS Hartford
- Awards: Medal of Honor

John Costello (c. 1850–1887) was a United States Navy sailor and a recipient of the United States military's highest decoration, the Medal of Honor.

== Biography ==
Born in about 1850 in Rouses Point, New York, Costello joined the Navy while living in that state. By July 16, 1876, he was serving as an ordinary seaman on the USS Hartford. On that day, while Hartford was in Philadelphia, Pennsylvania, he rescued a shipmate Charles J. Anderson who was a landsman from drowning. For this action, he was awarded the Medal of Honor eleven days later, on July 27.

Costello's official Medal of Honor citation reads:

On board the U.S.S. Hartford, Philadelphia, Pa., 16 July 1876. Showing gallantry, Costello rescued from drowning a landsman of that vessel.

== Chief Boatswain John Costello ==
On 7 November 1888 there was a John Costello who was appointed as a boatswain (warrant officer) in the U.S. Navy. It is possible, but undetermined, if he was the same John Costello who earned the Medal of Honor. He served on the USS Oregon at the time of her historic cruise around Cape Horn during the Spanish–American War.

Boatswain Costello was promoted to chief boatswain on 3 March 1899 and retired from the Navy on 24 May 1902. He died on 31 August 1908 in Wilmington, New York.

== See also ==
- List of Medal of Honor recipients during peacetime
