= Joseph H. Davis (Medal of Honor) =

- Born: July 22, 1860; Philadelphia, Pennsylvania, U.S.
- Died: June 19, 1903 (aged 42); Upper Darby, Pennsylvania, U.S.
- Burial place: Montrose Cemetery, Upper Darby Township, Pennsylvania
- Military career
- Allegiance: United States of America
- Branch: United States Navy
- Rank: Landsman
- Unit: USS Dale
- Awards: Medal of Honor

Joseph H. Davis (July 22, 1860 – June 19, 1903) was a United States Navy sailor and a recipient of the United States military's highest decoration, the Medal of Honor.

== Biography ==
Born on July 22, 1860, in Philadelphia, Pennsylvania, Davis joined the Navy from that city. By January 22, 1886, he was serving as a landsman on the receiving ship USS Dale. On that day, while at Norfolk, Virginia, he jumped overboard from a ferry and rescued Ordinary Seaman John Norman from drowning. For this action, he was awarded the Medal of Honor.

Davis's official Medal of Honor citation reads:

On board the U.S. Receiving Ship Dale off the Wharf at Norfolk, Va., 22 January 1886. Jumping overboard from the ferryboat, Davis rescued from drowning John Norman, ordinary seaman.

Davis left the Navy while still a landsman. He died on June 19, 1903, at age 42 and was buried at Montrose Cemetery in Upper Darby Township, Pennsylvania.

== See also ==
- List of Medal of Honor recipients during peacetime
