= Bresnahan =

Bresnahan is a surname. Notable people with the surname include:

- Chuck Bresnahan (born 1960), American football coach
- Patrick Francis Bresnahan (1872–1940), U.S. Navy sailor
- Roger Bresnahan (1879–1944), American baseball player
- Tom Bresnahan (born 1935), American football player
- Timothy Bresnahan (born 1953), American economist

== See also ==
- Mount Bresnahan, a mountain of Antarctica
