= George Willis (Medal of Honor) =

US Navy sailor and Medal of Honor recipient (1840–1884)

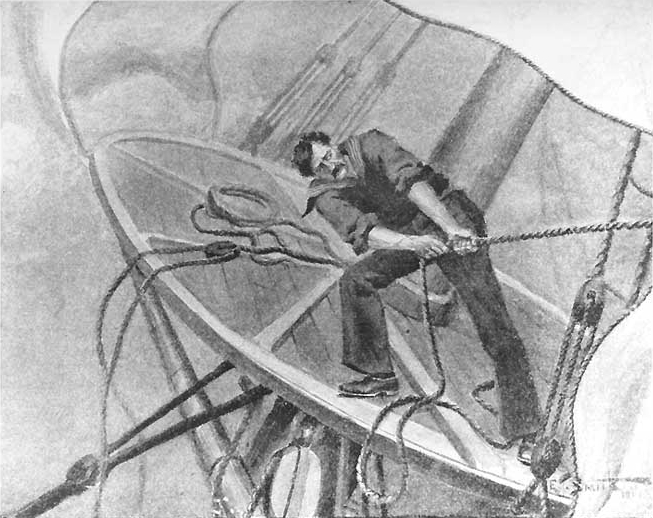
- Illustration of George Willis furling the sail
- Born: c. 1840; Boston, Massachusetts
- Died: December 7, 1884; Worcester, Massachusetts
- Burial place: Oak Grove Cemetery, Medford, Massachusetts
- Military career
- Allegiance: United States of America
- Branch: United States Navy
- Rank: Coxswain
- Unit: USS Tigress (1871)
- Awards: Medal of Honor

George Willis (c. 1840 – December 7, 1884) was a United States Navy sailor and a recipient of the United States military's highest decoration, the Medal of Honor.

== Biography ==
Willis enlisted in the Navy from his birth state of Massachusetts and served as a coxswain aboard the USS Tigress (1871) during the search for the missing exploration ship Polaris. When an Arctic gale struck Tigress off the coast of Greenland on the night of September 22, 1873, Willis volunteered to single-handedly furl (lower, roll up and secure) the loose fore topgallant sail, an act which prevented damage to the ship. For his conduct on that occasion, he was awarded the Medal of Honor.

== Medal of Honor citation ==
Coxswain Willis' official Medal of Honor citation reads simply:

Serving on board the U.S.S. Tigress, Willis displayed gallant and meritorious conduct on the night of September 22, 1873 off the coast of Greenland.

== See also ==
- List of Medal of Honor recipients
- List of Medal of Honor recipients during Peacetime
