= August Ohmsen =

American Navy officer

- Born: March 15, 1854; Germany
- Died: February 13, 1938; Portsmouth, Virginia, U.S.
- Burial place: Saint Pauls Cemetery Portsmouth, Virginia
- Military career
- Allegiance: United States of America
- Branch: United States Navy
- Rank: Lieutenant
- Unit: USS Tallapoosa (1863)
- Awards: Medal of Honor

August Ohmsen (March 15, 1854 – February 13, 1938) was a Master-at-Arms serving in the United States Navy who received the Medal of Honor for bravery.

== Biography ==
Ohmsen was born March 15, 1854, in Lubeck, Germany and enlisted in the United States Navy on November 7, 1878, in Berwick, England.

He was stationed aboard the USS Tallapoosa (1863) as a Master-at-Arms when, just before midnight August 21, 1884, the USS Tallapoosa collided with the schooner James S. Lowell about five miles from Vineyard Haven, Massachusetts, and started to sink. Ohmsen began clearing the deck and remained there until the water was waist deep, wading through it with outstretched arms waking up the men who were still asleep in their hammocks. Then, going on deck, he assisted in lowering the first cutter and then the dinghy, of which he took charge. For his actions on that night he received the Medal of Honor on October 18, 1884.

He was warranted as a boatswain on June 27, 1897, and promoted to chief boatswain on April 27, 1904. He retired from the Navy on November 25, 1910. During World War I he was recalled to active duty with the rank of lieutenant and was assigned to the Norfolk Navy Yard.

He died February 13, 1938.

== Medal of Honor citation ==
Rank and organization: Master-at-Arms, U.S. Navy. Born: 1853, Germany. Accredited to: New York. G.O. No.: 326, 18 October 1884.

Citation:

On board the U.S.S. Tallapoosa at the time of the sinking of that vessel, on the night of 21 August 1884. Clearing the berth deck, Ohmsen remained there until the water was waist deep, wading about with outstretched arms, rousing the men out of their hammocks. Then, going on deck, he assisted in lowering the first cutter and then the dinghy, of which he took charge.

== See also ==
- List of Medal of Honor recipients during Peacetime
