= William J. Creelman =

William James Creelman
- Born: August 3, 1874; Brooklyn, New York, U.S.
- Died: March 24, 1928 (aged 53); Brooklyn, New York, U.S.
- Military career
- Allegiance: United States
- Branch: United States Navy
- Rank: Landsman
- Unit: USS Maine
- Awards: Medal of Honor

William James Creelman (August 3, 1874 – March 24, 1928) was a United States Navy sailor and a recipient of the United States military's highest decoration, the Medal of Honor. He was awarded the medal for jumping overboard during an 1897 winter storm in an unsuccessful attempt to rescue a shipmate from drowning. Creelman went on to become a commissioned officer before leaving the Navy.

== Biography ==
Born on August 3, 1874, in Brooklyn, New York, Creelman joined the Navy from that state. By February 1897, he was serving as a landsman on the USS Maine.

=== Medal of Honor action ===
On the morning of February 4, Maine set out from Hampton Roads, Virginia, for Charleston, South Carolina, as part of the six-ship "White Squadron". Later that evening a strong storm developed which lasted for several days. Early on February 6, a large wave broke over the deck of the ship and washed away two sailors, Apprentice Leonard C. Kogel and Gunner's Mate Charles Hassel. After a lifebuoy was thrown to Hassel, Creelman jumped overboard into the rough seas and swam towards Kogel, but was unable to reach the apprentice before he sank beneath the waves. He then swam to Hassel and the two men clung to the lifebuoy as they were swept out of sight of Maine. Meanwhile, the ship's sailors put out a lifeboat which was quickly disabled after its steering oar was broken by the heavy waves. As Maine maneuvered to pick up the lifeboat and its crew, two more men were washed overboard and drowned. It was three and a half hours before the seas were calm enough for Maine to locate and take aboard Creelman and Hassel, still holding onto the lifebuoy and near exhaustion. For this action, Creelman was awarded the Medal of Honor.

Creelman's official Medal of Honor citation reads:

Attached to the U.S.S. Maine, February 1897. Distinguishing himself, William Creelman showed extraordinary heroism in the line of his profession during an attempt to save life at sea.

=== Later career ===
Creelman was promoted to the warrant officer rank of gunner on 30 May 1904 and to chief gunner on 30 May 1910. During World War I, Creelman received a temporary promotion to the commissioned officer rank of lieutenant on 1 July 1918. He retired from the Navy on 29 July 1926.

He died on March 24, 1928.

== See also ==
- List of Medal of Honor recipients during peacetime
