= George W. Cutter =

- Born: c. 1849; Philadelphia, Pennsylvania, US
- Military career
- Allegiance: United States
- Branch: United States Navy
- Rank: Landsman
- Unit: USS Powhatan
- Awards: Medal of Honor

George W. Cutter (born c. 1849, date of death unknown) was a United States Navy sailor and a recipient of the United States military's highest decoration, the Medal of Honor.

== Biography ==
Born in Philadelphia, Pennsylvania, in about 1849, Cutter joined the Navy from that state in 1868. By May 27, 1872, he was serving as a landsman on the USS Powhatan. On that day, while the ship was at Norfolk, Virginia, Seaman James Mitchell fell from Powhatan's rigging and landed in the water; he was rendered helpless in the fall. Cutter and two others, Second Assistant Engineer George Cowie and Ordinary Seaman Henry Couch, jumped overboard and saved Mitchell from drowning. For this action, Cutter was awarded the Medal of Honor a month and a half later, on July 9.

Cutter's official Medal of Honor citation reads:

On board the U.S.S. Powhatan, Norfolk, Va., 27 May 1872. Jumping overboard on this date, Cutter aided in saving one of the crew of that vessel from drowning.

== See also ==
- List of Medal of Honor recipients during peacetime
