= John W. Magee =

American Medal of Honor recipient

- Born: c. 1848; Washington D.C., US
- Military career
- Allegiance: United States of America
- Branch: United States Navy
- Service years: 1867–888
- Rank: Second Class Fireman
- Unit: USS Tallapoosa (1863)
- Awards: Medal of Honor

John Wellesley Magee (born c. 1848) was a second class fireman serving in the United States Navy who received the Medal of Honor for bravery.

== Biography ==
Magee was born in 1848 in Washington, D.C., and enlisted in the Navy from Maryland in 1867. After joining the navy he was stationed aboard the USS Tallapoosa (1863) as a second class fireman. Just before midnight August 21, 1884 the USS Tallapoosa collided with the schooner James S. Lowell about five miles from Vineyard Haven, Massachusetts and started to sink. Magee remained at his post in the fireroom until the fires were put out by the rising waters. For his actions on that night he received the Medal October 18, 1884.

== Medal of Honor citation ==
Rank and organization: Second Class Fireman, U.S. Navy. Born: 1859, Maryland. Accredited to: Maryland. G.O. No.: 326, 18 October 1884.

Citation:

Serving on board the U.S.S. Tallapoosa during the sinking of that vessel on the night of 21 August 1884. During this period, Magee remained at his post of duty in the fireroom until the fires were put out by the rising waters.

== See also ==
- List of Medal of Honor recipients during Peacetime
