= Antonio Williams (seaman) =

US seaman (1825–1908)

- Born: c. 1825; Malta
- Died: 22 July 1908; Bristol, U.K.
- Burial place: Greenbank Cemetery, Bristol
- Military career
- Allegiance: United States of America
- Branch: United States Navy
- Rank: Seaman
- Unit: USS Huron (1875)
- Awards: Medal of Honor

Antonio Williams (c. 1825–1908) was a seaman first class serving in the United States Navy who received the Medal of Honor for bravery.

== Biography ==
Williams was born in 1825 in Malta and after emigrating to the United States he joined the United States Navy.

He was stationed on the USS Huron (1875) when it departed Hampton Roads, Virginia, 23 November 1877, and proceeded to Cuba on a scientific cruise. At approximately 1:00 a.m. on 24 November, near Nags Head, North Carolina, the Huron encountered heavy weather and wrecked. Initially the crew attempted to free the vessel but the ship heeled over killing 98 of the crew. For his actions Williams received the Medal of Honor in 1879.

Williams married an English woman and retired to the city of Bristol, England. He died on 22 July 1908 and is buried in Greenbank Cemetery, Bristol.

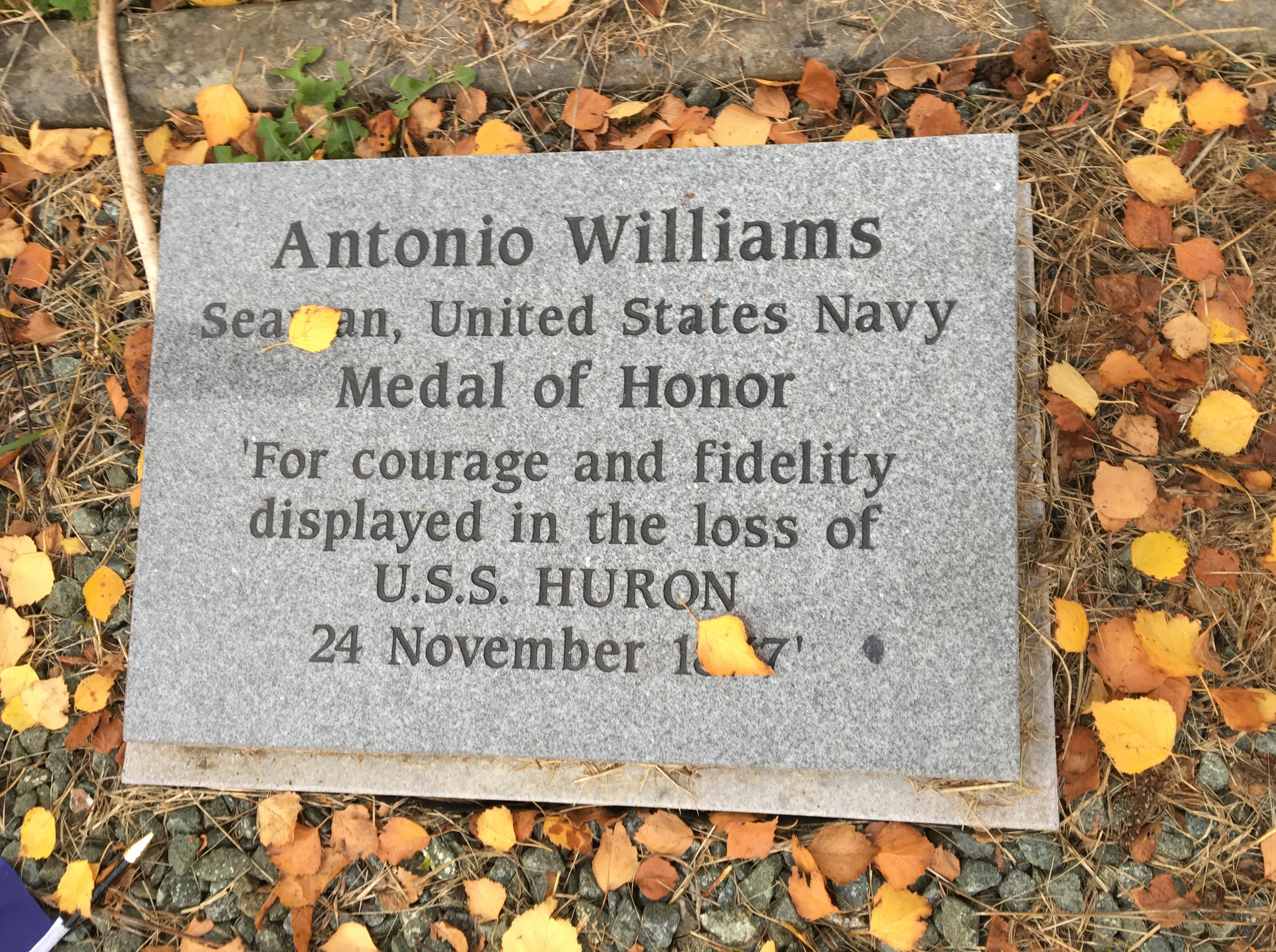
Antonio Williams's grave in Greenbank Cemetery, Bristol, UK

== Medal of Honor citation ==
Rank and organization: Seaman, U.S. Navy. Born: 1825, Malta.

Citation:

For courage and fidelity displayed in the loss of the U.S.S. Huron, 24 November 1877.

== See also ==
- List of Medal of Honor recipients in non-combat incidents
