= David Harrington =

David or Dave Harrington may refer to:

- David Harrington (footballer) (born 2000), Irish professional footballer who plays as a goalkeeper
- David Harrington (Medal of Honor) (1856–1945), U.S. Navy sailor and Medal of Honor recipient
- David Harrington (musician), violinist and founder of the Kronos Quartet
- David C. Harrington (born 1954), American politician from Maryland
- David Harrington (New Zealand politician) (1936–2009), Mayor of Invercargill from 1995 to 1998
- Dave Harrington (darts player) (born 1953), darts player from New Zealand
- Dave Harrington (musician) (born 1985), multi-instrumentalist, producer and one half of the electronic music duo Darkside
