= Albert J. Smith =

Albert J. Smith may refer to:

- Albert James Smith, New Brunswick politician
- Albert J. Smith (actor), American film actor
- A. J. Smith, American football scout and executive
- Albert Joseph Smith, United States Marine and Medal of Honor recipient

== See also ==
- Albert Smith (disambiguation)
