= Robert Henry King =

American sailor

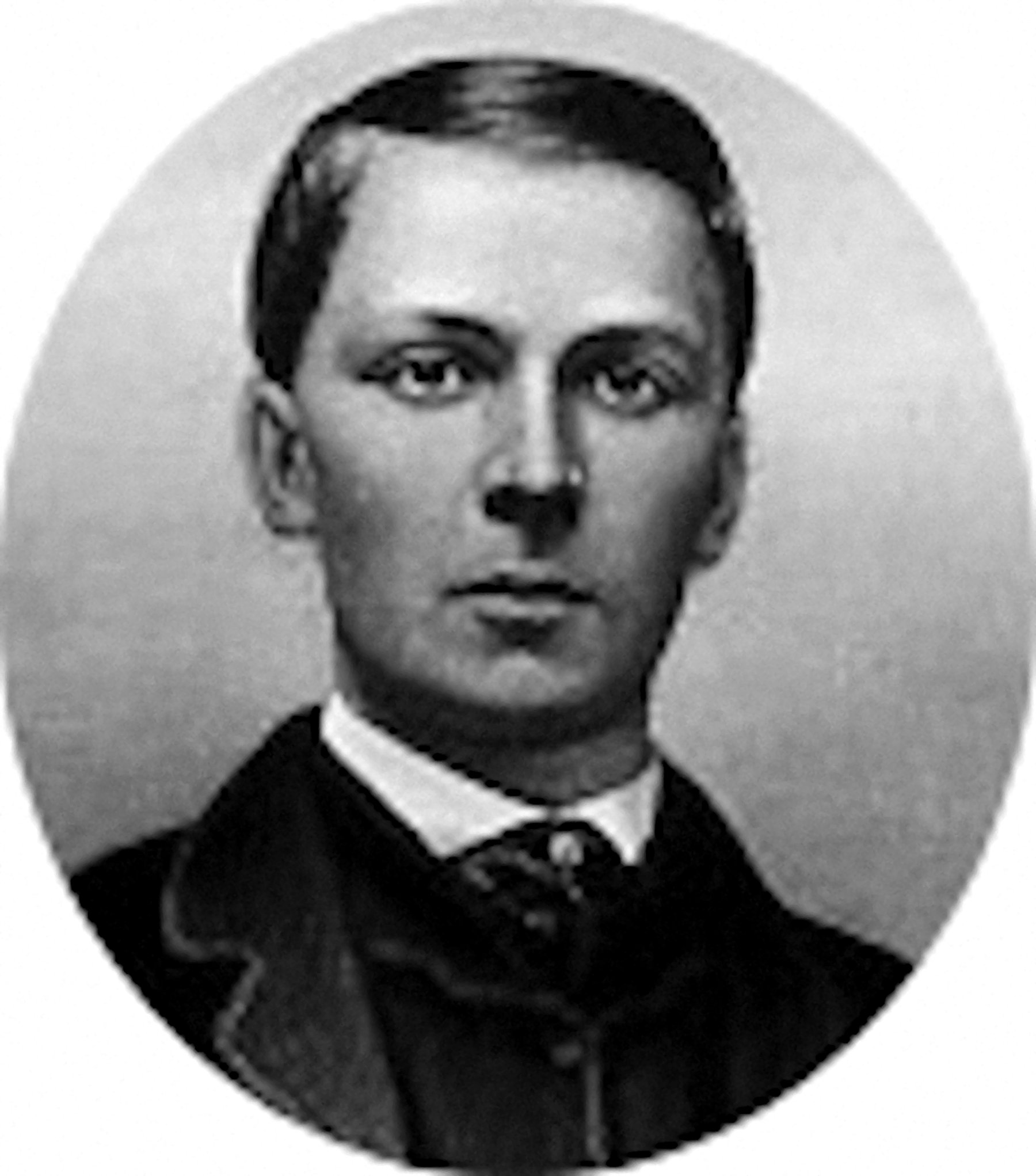
Robert Henry King, c. 1865

Robert Henry King (c. 1845 - April 10, 1865) was an American sailor and recipient of the Medal of Honor who earned the award for his actions during the American Civil War.

== Biography ==
King was born in New York in about 1845. He served as a Landsman aboard Picket Boat No. 1 during the American Civil War. He earned his medal in action on October 27, 1864, aboard Picket Boat No. 1. His medal was issued on December 31, 1864. He died in Albany, New York on April 10, 1865, and is now buried in Albany Rural Cemetery in Albany, New York.

== Medal of Honor Citation ==
King served on board the U.S. Picket Boat No. 1, in action, 27 October 1864, against the Confederate ram, CSS Albemarle, which had resisted repeated attacks by our steamers and had kept a large force of vessels employed in watching her.
