= Robert Edward Cox =

United States Navy Medal of Honor recipient (1876–1937)

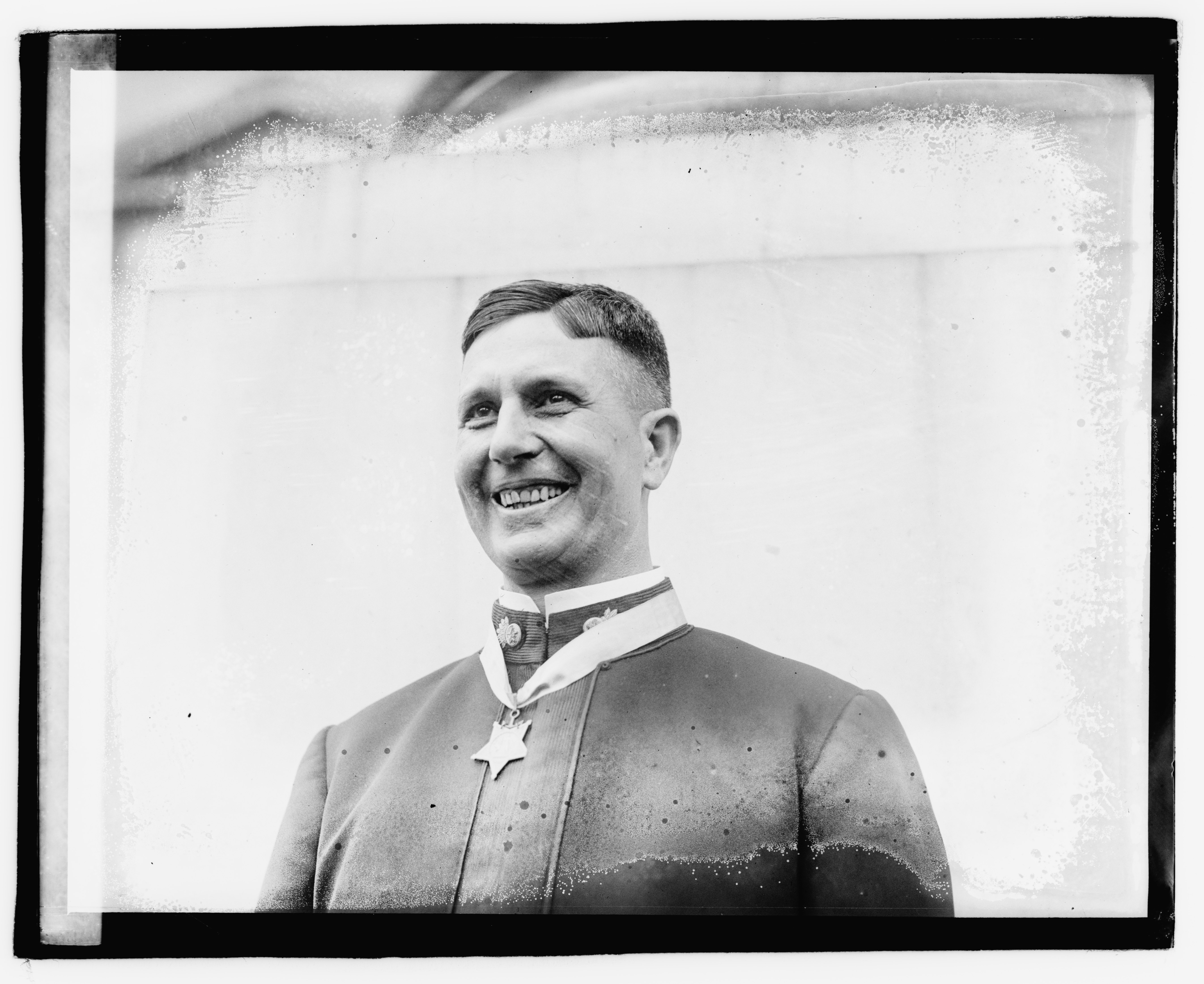
- Robert Edward Cox receiving his Congressional Medal of Honor in 1921.
- Born: December 22, 1876; St. Albans, West Virginia, U.S.
- Died: April 24, 1937 (aged 60); Philadelphia, Pennsylvania, U.S.
- Burial place: Rose Hill Cemetery Altoona, Pennsylvania, US
- Military career
- Allegiance: United States of America
- Branch: United States Navy
- Service years: 1893–1926
- Rank: Chief Gunner's Mate
- Unit: USS Missouri (BB-11)
- Conflicts: Spanish–American War; World War I
- Awards: Medal of Honor

Robert Edward Cox (December 22, 1876 – April 24, 1937) was a sailor serving in the United States Navy who received the Medal of Honor for bravery.

== Biography ==
Cox was born December 22, 1876, in St. Albans, West Virginia and joined the navy on May 20, 1893. He was warranted as a gunner on April 11, 1901 and stationed aboard the battleship USS Missouri (BB-11).

On April 13, 1904, the Missouri was engaging in target practice when one of the ships 12" guns "flared back". As the breech was opened for reloading, hot gases were released into the turret, causing it to catch fire. The fire spread to a bag of propellant and from there it spread down to the ammunition handling chamber. Cox along with 2 gunners mates contained the fire before it spread to other areas of the ship and helped in putting out the blaze. The fire was eventually contained but before it was out 36 of the ship's crew were dead. For his actions he received the Medal of Honor April 14, 1921.

As a warranted ship's officer, Cox was not eligible for the Medal of Honor immediately after the incident. He received the award seventeen years later after the U.S. Congress specifically authorized it on February 1, 1921.

Cox was promoted to chief gunner on April 11, 1907 and retired from the U.S. Navy on April 15, 1926.

He died April 24, 1937, and is buried in Rose Hill Cemetery Altoona, Pennsylvania.

== Medal of Honor citation ==
Rank and organizarion: Chief Gunner's Mate, U.S. Navy. Born: 22 December 1855, St. Albans, W. Va. Accredited to: West Virginia. G.O. No.: 43, 14 April 1921. (Medal presented by President Harding.)

Citation:

For extraordinary heroism on U.S.S. Missouri 13 April 1904. While at target practice off Pensacola, Fla., an accident occurred in the after turret of the Missouri whereby the lives of 5 officers and 28 men were lost. The ship was in imminent danger of destruction by explosion, and the prompt action of C.G. Cox and 2 gunners' mates caused the fire to be brought under control, and the loss of the Missouri, together with her crew, was averted.

== See also ==
- List of Medal of Honor recipients during peacetime
