= Schepke =

Schepke is a German surname that may refer to

- Charles S. Schepke (1878–1933), United States Navy gunner
- Frank Schepke (1935–2017), German rower
- Joachim Schepke (1912–1941), German U-boat commander
- Kraft Schepke (born 1934), German rower, brother of Frank
- Matt Schepke (born 1985), American ice hockey player
