= John Morris (Medal of Honor) =

- Born: January 25, 1855 or February 12, 1862; Dublin, Ireland
- Military career
- Allegiance: United States
- Branch: United States Marine Corps
- Service years: 1880- 1895
- Rank: Corporal
- Unit: USS Lancaster (1858)
- Awards: Medal of Honor

John Morris (born January 25, 1855, or February 12, 1862 (Note: References differ to his birth date. The Marine Corps Who's Who site reflects it as February 12, 1862 and the Army Center of Military History, Military times Hall of Valor and the Find a Grave site reflect it as January 25, 1855)) – ?) was a Corporal serving in the United States Marine Corps serving aboard the USS Lancaster (1858) who received the Medal of Honor for saving another sailor from drowning.

== Biography ==
Morris was born between January 25, 1855, and February 12, 1862, in Dublin, Ireland (Note: References differ to his birth location. The Marine Corps Who's Who site reflects it as Dublin, Ireland and the Army Center of Military History, Military times Hallofvalor and the Find a Grave site reflect it as New York City, New York) but immigrated to the United States. In November 1880 he joined the Marine Corps from Brooklyn, New York and was assigned to the marine contingent aboard the USS Lancaster. When the ship was at Villefranche, France, December 25, 1881 an ordinary seaman and prisoner named Robert Blizzard attempted to escape custody by jumping overboard. Corporal Morris jumped into the water afterwards to save Blizzard from drowning and for his actions he received the Medal of Honor October 18, 1884. Morris was honorably discharged from the Marine Corps April 20, 1895.

== Medal of Honor citation ==
Rank and organization: Corporal, U.S. Marine Corps. Born: 25 January 1855, New York, N.Y. Accredited to: New York. G.O. No.: 326, 18 October 1884. For leaping overboard from the U.S. Flagship Lancaster, at Villefranche, France, 25 December 1881, and rescuing from drowning Robert Blizzard, ordinary seaman, a prisoner, who had jumped overboard.

== See also ==
- List of Medal of Honor recipients during peacetime
