= Henry Thompson (Medal of Honor) =

United States Navy sailor, recipient of the Medal of Honor

- Navy Medal of Honor
- Military career
- Allegiance: United States of America
- Branch: United States Navy
- Rank: Seaman
- Unit: USS Pensacola
- Awards: Medal of Honor

Henry Thompson was a United States Navy sailor and a recipient of the United States military's highest decoration, the Medal of Honor.

Thompson joined the Navy and by June 27, 1878, was serving at the rank of seaman. At Mare Island, California, that day, he rescued a man from drowning, for which he was awarded the Medal of Honor.

Thompson's official Medal of Honor citation reads:

For rescuing a man from drowning at Mare Island, Calif., 27 June 1878.

== See also ==
- List of Medal of Honor recipients during peacetime
