= Richard H. Taylor =

Quartermaster in the United States Navy

Richard Hamilton Taylor
- Born: September 8, 1870; Staunton, Virginia, US
- Died: March 24, 1956 (aged 85); Cambridge, Massachusetts, US
- Military career
- Allegiance: United States
- Branch: United States Navy
- Rank: Quartermaster
- Unit: USS Nipsic (1863)
- Awards: Medal of Honor

Richard Hamilton Taylor (September 8, 1870 – March 24, 1956) was a quartermaster serving in the United States Navy who received the Medal of Honor for bravery.

Taylor was born in Staunton, Virginia, and later joined the navy. He was stationed aboard the USS Nipsic (1863) as a quartermaster when, on March 16, 1889, a hurricane overwhelmed the ship while it was moored in Apia, Samoa. For his actions received the Medal of Honor March 20, 1905.

== Medal of Honor citation ==
Rank and organization: Quartermaster, U.S. Navy. Born: 1871, Virginia. Accredited to: Virginia. G.O. No.: 157, 20 April 1904.

Citation:

Serving on board the U.S.S. Nipsic, Taylor displayed gallantry during the hurricane at Apia, Samoa, 16 March 1889.

== See also ==
- List of Medal of Honor recipients during peacetime
