= John Stokes (Medal of Honor) =

United States Navy Medal of Honor recipient

John S. Stokes
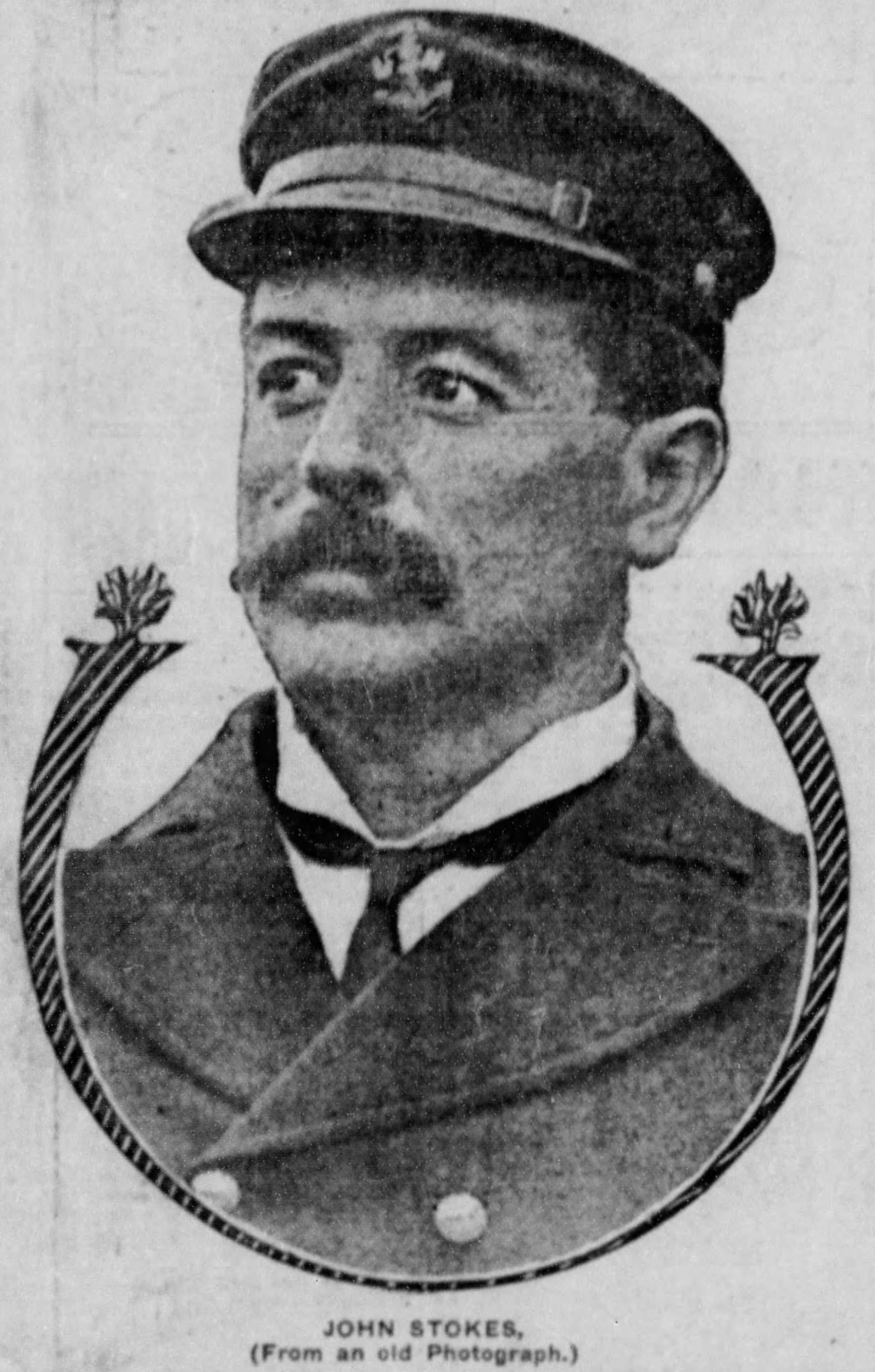
- John Stokes portrait, 14 Feb 1910 Seattle, WA The Seattle Star newspaper, front page
- Born: June 12, 1871; New York City, US
- Died: February 14, 1923 (aged 51)
- Burial place: Arlington National Cemetery, Arlington, Virginia
- Military career
- Allegiance: United States of America
- Branch: United States Navy
- Rank: Boatswain
- Unit: USS New York
- Awards: Medal of Honor

John S. Stokes was a Chief Master-at-Arms in the United States Navy and a Medal of Honor recipient.

He was born in New York on June 12, 1871. He enlisted in the Navy and had risen to the rank of chief master-at-arms when, on March 31, 1899, on board the armored cruiser USS New York he jumped overboard to assist in the rescue of a fellow sailor who was in danger of drowning. For this action he was awarded the Medal of Honor on July 29, 1899.

He was appointed to the warrant officer rank of boatswain on January 31, 1907, and retired from the Navy on July 26, 1911. He spent the last years of his life at the US Navy Treatment Hospital in Washington, D.C.

He died on February 14, 1923, and is buried at Arlington National Cemetery, Arlington, Virginia. His grave can be found in section 17, lot 20184.

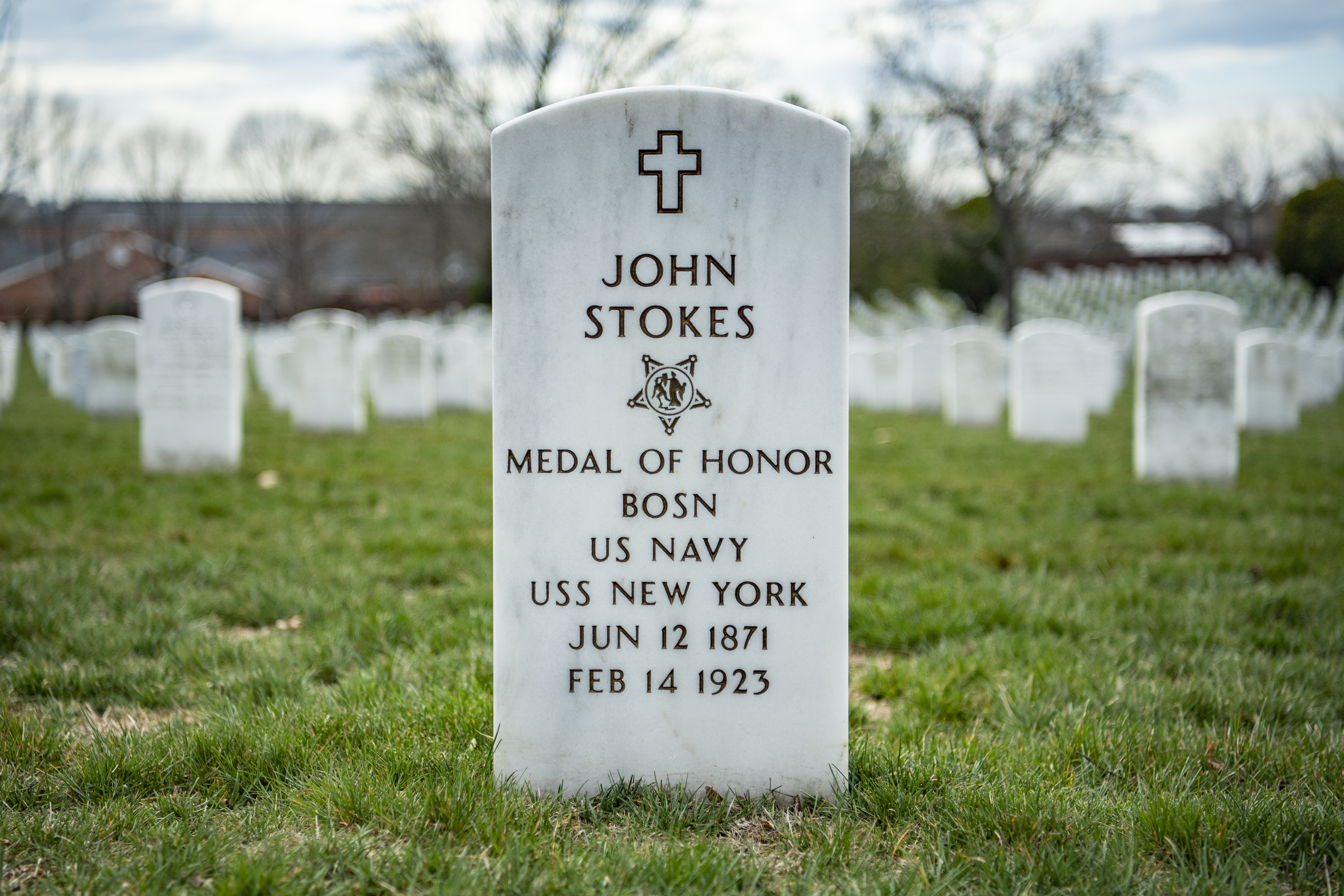
Grave at Arlington National Cemetery

== Medal of Honor citation ==
Rank and organization: Chief Master-at-Arms, U.S. Navy. Born: 12 June 1871, New York, N.Y. Accredited to: New York. G.O. No.: 525 29 July 1899.

Citation:

On board the U.S.S. New York off the coast of Jamaica, 31 March 1899. Showing gallant conduct, Stokes jumped overboard and assisted in the rescue of Peter Mahoney, watertender, U.S. Navy.

== See also ==
- List of Medal of Honor recipients during peacetime
