= Henry Williams (Medal of Honor) =

- Born: February 6, 1834; British North America
- Died: October 17, 1917 (aged 83); Wildwood Crest, New Jersey, U.S.
- Burial place: West Laurel Hill Cemetery, Bala Cynwyd, Pennsylvania, U.S.
- Military career
- Allegiance: United States of America
- Branch: United States Navy
- Rank: Carpenter's Mate
- Unit: USS Constitution
- Awards: Medal of Honor

Henry Williams (February 6, 1834 – October 17, 1917) was a sailor serving in the United States Navy who received the Medal of Honor for bravery.

== Biography ==
Williams was born on February 6, 1834, in British North America. After emigrating to the United States, he enlisted in the U.S. Navy on September 27, 1873.

He was stationed aboard the USS Constitution as a carpenter's mate when, on February 13, 1879, he risked his life to repair the ship's rudder in a heavy gale. For his actions he received the Medal of Honor October 18, 1884.

Williams was promoted to the warrant officer rank of carpenter on 1 June 1880. He retired from the Navy on February 6, 1896, having reached the mandatory retirement age of 62.

He died October 17, 1917, and is buried in West Laurel Hill Cemetery, Bala Cynwyd, Pennsylvania.

== Medal of Honor citation ==
Rank and organization: Carpenter's Mate, U.S. Navy. Born 1833 Canada. Accredited to: Pennsylvania. G.O. No.: 326, 18 October 1884

Citation:

For going over the stern of the U.S.S. Constitution, at sea, 13 February 1879, during a heavy gale, and performing important carpenter's work upon her rudder.

== See also ==
- List of Medal of Honor recipients in non-combat incidents
