= Demetri Corahorgi =

- Born: January 3, 1880; Greece
- Died: October 15, 1973 (aged 93); Seattle, Washington, U.S.
- Burial place: Mount Pleasant Cemetery, Seattle
- Military career
- Allegiance: United States of America
- Branch: United States Navy
- Rank: Fireman First Class
- Unit: USS Iowa
- Awards: Medal of Honor

Demetri Corahorgi (January 3, 1880 – October 15, 1973) was a fireman first class serving in the United States Navy during who received the Medal of Honor for bravery.

== Biography ==
Corahorgi was born January 3, 1880, in Greece. After immigrating to the United States, he joined the navy in New York. He was stationed aboard the USS Iowa as a fireman first class when on January 25, 1905, a manhole plate blew out from boiler D. For his actions he received the Medal of Honor March 20, 1905.

He died October 15, 1973, and is buried in Mount Pleasant Cemetery, Seattle.

== Medal of Honor citation ==
Rank and organization: Fireman First Class, U.S. Navy. Place and date: Aboard U.S.S. Iowa, 25 January 1905. Entered service at: New York. Born: 3 January 1880, Trieste, Austria. G.O. No.: 182, 20 March 1905.

Citation:

Serving on board the U.S.S. Iowa for extraordinary heroism at the time of the blowing out of the manhole plate of boiler D on board that vessel, 25 January 1905.

== See also ==
- List of Medal of Honor recipients in non-combat incidents
