= James Augustin Greer =

United States Navy admiral (1833–1904)

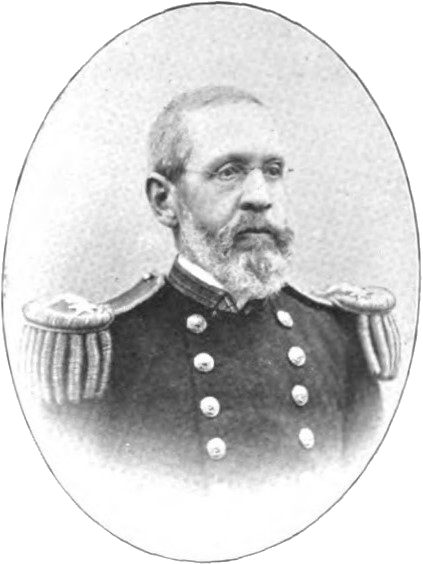
- Admiral Greer in 1892
- Born: February 28, 1833; Cincinnati, Ohio, U.S.
- Died: June 17, 1904 (aged 71); Washington, D.C., U.S.
- Burial place: Arlington National Cemetery
- Military career
- Allegiance: United States of America
- Branch: United States Navy
- Service years: 1848–1895
- Rank: Rear admiral
- Commands: USS Carondelet; USS Benton; USS Black Hawk; USS Mohongo; USS Tuscarora; USS Tigress; USS Constitution; USS Constellation; USS Hartford; European Squadron
- Conflicts: American Civil War; Siege of Vicksburg; Battle of Grand Gulf; Red River campaign

James Augustin Greer (February 28, 1833 – June 17, 1904) was a rear admiral in the United States Navy, who served during the Civil War.

== Early years ==
Greer was born in Cincinnati, Ohio. He enlisted into the Navy on January 10, 1848, shortly before his 15th birthday, joining the sloop Saratoga as a midshipman. He entered the United States Naval Academy in 1853, and graduated as a passed midshipman the following year. After participating in the Paraguay Expedition, he cruised the west African coast until the outbreak of the Civil War.

== Civil War ==
Greer was serving as a lieutenant on board the San Jacinto on November 7, 1861, when she stopped the British steamer Trent and removed the Confederate diplomatic commissioners on their way to Britain, thereby nearly drawing Great Britain into the war on the Confederate side. This incident became celebrated as the Trent Affair.

Greer was promoted to lieutenant commander and served on the St. Louis from 1862 to 1863, and then was attached to Rear Admiral David Dixon Porter's Mississippi Squadron. While in command of the ironclads Carondelet and Benton, he participated in the Vicksburg campaign and the shelling of Grand Gulf as well as the abortive Union Red River expedition in early 1864.

After commanding the Naval Station at Mound City, Illinois, he assumed command of the Black Hawk, flagship of the Mississippi River Squadron under Samuel Phillips Lee, and was then in charge of conveying Army transports up the Tennessee River.

In 1866 he was elected a companion of the Pennsylvania Commandery of the Military Order of the Loyal Legion of the United States (MOLLUS). He was assigned MOLLUS insignia number 160.

== Post-war service ==
A tour of duty as assistant to the Commandant at Annapolis after the war was followed by promotion to commander on July 25, 1866 and appointment to command of Mohongo with the Pacific Squadron, where Greer was commended for "defending American interests" in Mexico. He then commanded the Tuscarora. After a tour of duty at the Naval Academy between 1869 and 1873, Greer returned to the Pacific Station. In 1873, he commanded the Tigress when that ship was sent to find and aid the ship Polaris. The Polaris was wrecked on an Arctic expedition which had been led by Charles Francis Hall.

Greer was promoted to captain in 1876. After special service in Constitution during the 1878 Paris Exposition, Greer commanded the ships Constellation and Hartford.

He held a variety of shore posts and was promoted to commodore in 1886 before serving as commander of the European Squadron from 1887 to 1889.

Greer served as president of the "Board of Organization, Tactics, and Drill", and of the "Examination and Retiring Board".

He was promoted to rear admiral in 1892, and retired on February 28, 1895. Admiral Greer died in Washington, D.C., on June 17, 1904, and was buried with full military honors in Arlington National Cemetery two days later.

== Namesakes ==
- The destroyer USS Greer (DD-145) was named for him.
- Several Tom Clancy novels feature a Vice Admiral James Greer, who is the Deputy Director of Central Intelligence.
