= Patrick Shanahan (Medal of Honor) =

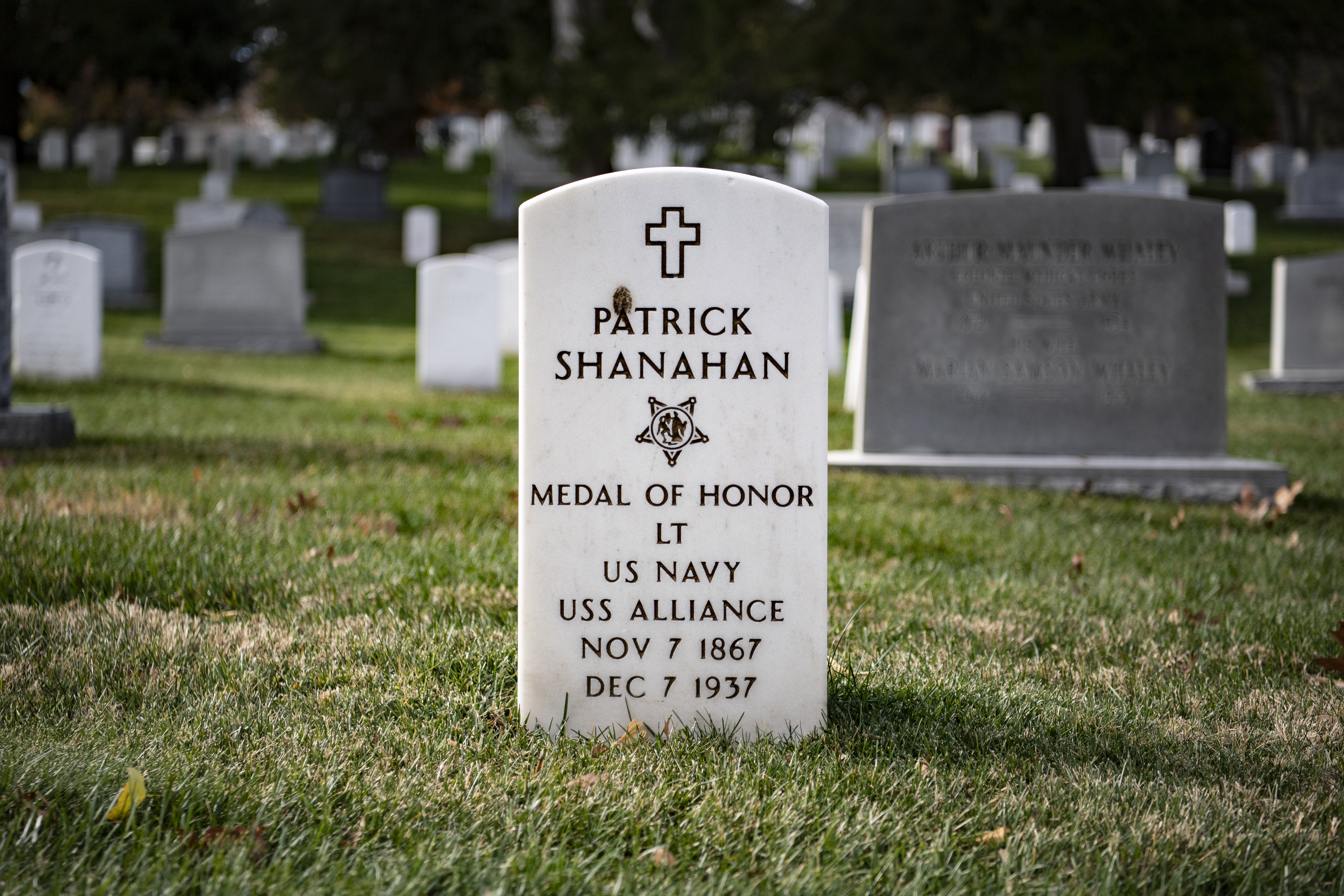
- Grave at Arlington National Cemetery
- Born: November 6, 1867; Ireland
- Died: December 7, 1937
- Burial place: Arlington National Cemetery
- Military career
- Allegiance: United States of America
- Branch: United States Navy
- Service years: 1892 - 1922
- Rank: Lieutenant
- Unit: USS Alliance
- Awards: Medal of Honor

Patrick Shanahan (November 6, 1867 – December 7, 1937) was a United States Navy sailor who received the Medal of Honor. He was presented the medal on 7 April 1901 while serving on the USS Essex. (Logbook 46 of USS Essex, NA, Washington DC)

== Biography ==
Shanahan was born in Ireland, emigrated to the United States and enlisted in the U.S. Navy 1892.

In 1899 he was a chief boatswain's mate on the USS Alliance when he rescued another sailor from drowning. For this action, he was awarded the Medal of Honor.

He was warranted to boatswain on March 11, 1902, and promoted to chief boatswain on March 11, 1908. During World War I, he received a temporary promotion to lieutenant on July 1, 1918.

He retired from the Navy in 1922 and died in 1937. He is buried in Arlington National Cemetery.

== Medal of Honor citation ==
Rank and organization: Chief Boatswain's Mate, U.S. Navy. Born: November 6, 1867, Ireland. Accredited to: New York. G.O. No.: 534, November 29, 1899.

Citation:

On board the U.S.S. Alliance, 28 May 1899. Displaying heroism, Shanahan rescued William Steven, quartermaster, first class, from drowning.

== See also ==
- List of Medal of Honor recipients during peacetime
