= August Wilson (Medal of Honor) =

- Born: March 1, 1864; Danzig, West Prussia, Prussia
- Died: Unknown; Unknown
- Military career
- Allegiance: United States of America
- Branch: United States Navy
- Rank: Boilermaker
- Unit: USS Puritan (BM-1)
- Awards: Medal of Honor

August Wilson (March 1, 1864 – ?) was a United States Navy sailor and a recipient of the United States military's highest decoration, the Medal of Honor.

== Biography ==
Wilson was born March 1, 1864, in Danzig, Prussia and emigrated to the U.S., joining the Navy from New York state. On July 1, 1897, he was serving as a boilermaker on the USS Puritan (BM-1) when one of the crown sheets collapsed on boiler E. He entered the fireroom after wrapping wet cloths around his face and arms to protect him from the heat and flames. Once in the fireroom he opened the safety valve to prevent the other boilers from being damaged or destroyed. For his actions he received the Medal of Honor.

== Medal of Honor citation ==
Rank and organization: Boilermaker, U.S. Navy. Born: 1 March 1864, Danzig, Germany. Accredited to: New York. G.O. No.. 482, November 1897.

Citation:

For gallant conduct while serving on board the U.S.S. Puritan and at the time of the collapse of one of the crown sheets of boiler E on that vessel, 1 July 1897. Wrapping wet cloths about his face and arms, Wilson entered the fireroom and opened the safety valve, thus removing the danger of disabling the other boilers.

== See also ==
- List of Medal of Honor recipients in non-combat incidents
