= David Harrington (Medal of Honor) =

US Navy sailor and Medal of Honor recipient (1856–1945)

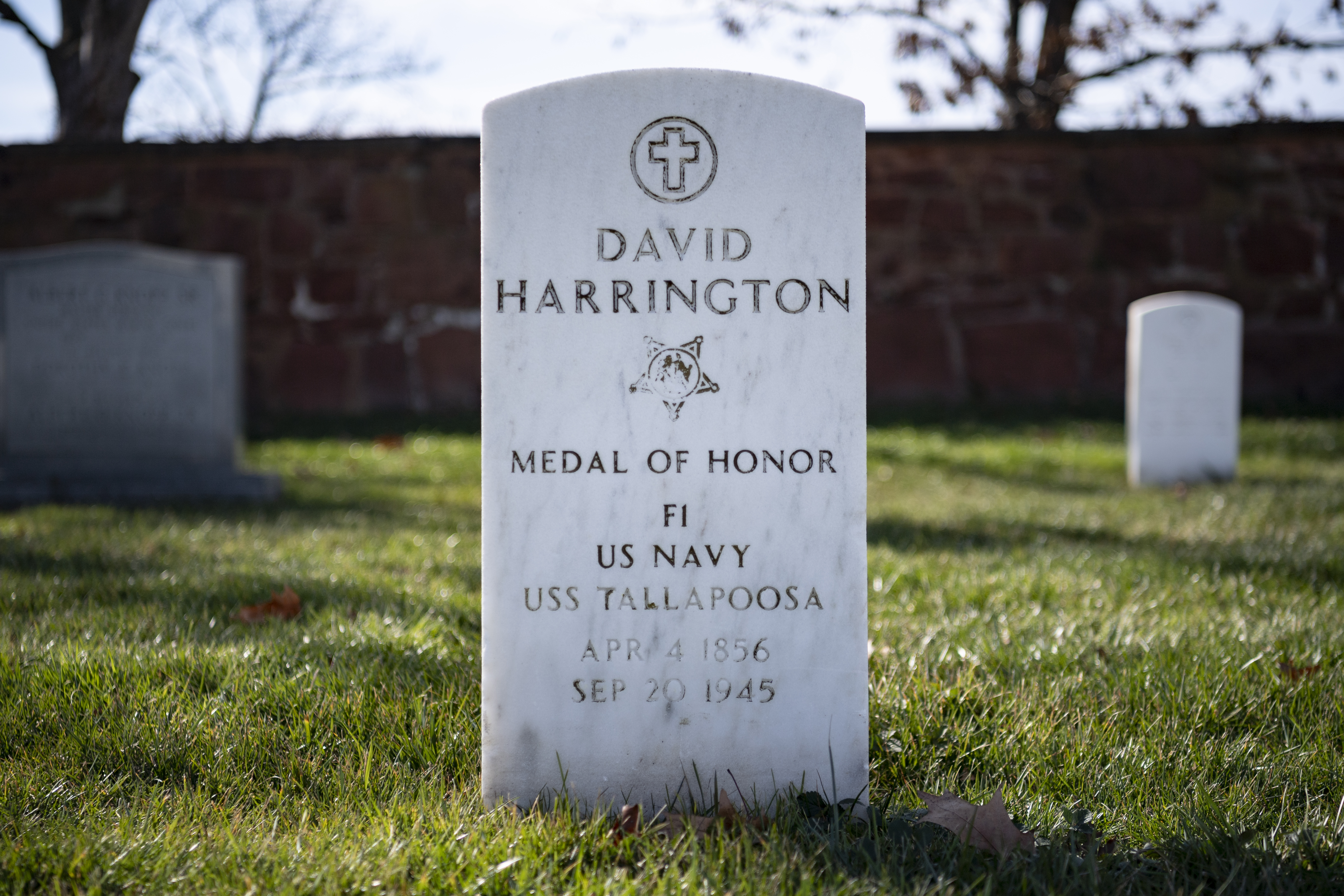
- Grave at Arlington National Cemetery
- Born: April 4, 1856; Washington, D.C., US
- Died: September 20, 1945 (aged 89)
- Burial place: Arlington National Cemetery, Arlington, Virginia
- Military career
- Allegiance: United States
- Branch: United States Navy
- Rank: Fireman First Class
- Unit: USS Tallapoosa (1863)
- Awards: Medal of Honor

David Harrington (April 4, 1856 – September 20, 1945) was a fireman first class serving in the United States Navy who received the Medal of Honor for bravery.

== Biography ==
Harrington was born April 4, 1856, in Washington, D.C. After joining the navy he was stationed aboard the USS Tallapoosa (1863) as a fireman first class. Just before midnight August 21, 1884 the USS Tallapoosa collided with the schooner James S. Lowell about five miles from Vineyard Haven, Rhode Island and started to sink. Harrington remained in the fireroom until the fires were put out by the rising waters and when the water was up to his waist he opened the safety valves. For his actions on that night he received the Medal October 18, 1884.

He died September 20, 1945, and was buried at Arlington National Cemetery, Arlington, Virginia.

== Medal of Honor citation ==
Rank and organization: First Class Fireman, U.S. Navy. Born: 1856, Washington, D.C. Accredited to: Washington, D.C. G.O. No.: 326, 18 October 1884.

Citation:

Served on board the U.S.S. Tallapoosa at the time of the sinking of that vessel, on the night of 21 August 1884. Remaining at his post of duty in the fireroom until the fires were put out by the rising waters, Harrington opened the safety valves when the water was up to his waist.

== See also ==
- List of Medal of Honor recipients during Peacetime
