= Joseph Matthews (Medal of Honor) =

- Born: c. 1849; Malta
- Died: November 11, 1912 (aged 62–63); Brunswick, Georgia, U.S.
- Burial place: Palmetto Cemetery Brunswick, Georgia
- Military career
- Allegiance: United States
- Branch: United States Navy
- Rank: Captain of the Top
- Unit: USS Constitution
- Awards: Medal of Honor

Joseph Matthews (c. 1849 - November 11, 1912) was a sailor in the United States Navy who received the Medal of Honor for bravery.

== Biography ==
Matthews was born in about 1849 in Malta. After immigrating to the United States, he joined the navy. He was stationed aboard the USS Constitution as captain of the top when, on February 13, 1879, he risked his life to cut the fastenings of the ship's rudder chains in a heavy gale. For his actions, he received the Medal of Honor on October 18, 1884.

He died on November 11, 1912.

== Medal of Honor citation ==
Rank and organization: Captain of the Top, U.S. Navy. Born: 1849, Malta. Accredited to: Pennsylvania. G.O. No.: 326, 18 October 1884.

Citation:

For courageous conduct in going over the stern of the U.S.S. Constitution at sea, 13 February 1879, during a heavy gale, and cutting the fastenings of the ship's rudder chains.

== See also ==
- List of Medal of Honor recipients during peacetime
