= Edward Floyd (Medal of Honor) =

- Born: February 21, 1850; Ireland
- Died: January 16, 1923 (aged 72)
- Burial place: Saint Lawrence Cemetery Charleston, South Carolina
- Military career
- Allegiance: United States
- Branch: United States Navy
- Rank: Boilermaker
- Unit: USS Iowa (BB-4)
- Awards: Medal of Honor

Edward Floyd (February 21, 1850 – January 16, 1923) was a boilermaker serving in the United States Navy who received the Medal of Honor for bravery.

== Biography ==
Floyd was born on February 21, 1850, in Ireland. After immigrating to the United States joined the navy, he was stationed aboard the USS Iowa (BB-4) as a boilermaker when on January 25, 1905, a boiler plate blew out from boiler D. For his actions during the explosion he received the medal March 20, 1905.

He served as an honorary pallbearer at the Tomb of the Unknown Soldier in 1921.

He died on January 16, 1923, and is buried in Saint Lawrence Cemetery Charleston, South Carolina.

== Medal of Honor citation ==
Rank and organization: Boilermaker, U.S. Navy. Born: 21 February 1850, Ireland. Accredited to: South Carolina. G.O. No.: 182, 20 March 1905.

Citation:

Serving on board the U.S.S. Iowa, for extraordinary heroism at the time of the blowing out of the manhole plate of boiler D on board that vessel, 25 January 1905.

== See also ==
- List of Medal of Honor recipients in non-combat incidents
