= James Horton (Medal of Honor, 1879) =

- Born: 1850; Boston, Massachusetts, US
- Died: Unknown
- Military career
- Allegiance: United States
- Branch: United States Navy
- Rank: Captain of the Top
- Unit: USS Constitution
- Awards: Medal of Honor

James Horton (born 1850) was a sailor serving in the United States Navy who received the Medal of Honor for bravery.

== Biography ==
Horton was born in 1850 in Boston, Massachusetts and after joining the Navy was stationed aboard the USS Constitution as captain of the top. On February 13, 1879, he risked his life along with two other sailors to repair the ship's rudder during a storm. Horton was lowered over the stern of the ship and cut the fastenings of the ship's rudder chains, allowing the rudder itself to be repaired. For his actions he received the Medal of Honor March 20, 1905.

== Medal of Honor citation ==
Rank and organization: Captain of the Top, U.S. Navy. Born: 1850, Boston, Mass. Accredited to: Massachusetts. G.O. No.: 326, 18 October 1884.

Citation:

Serving on board the U.S.S. Constitution, at sea, 13 February 1879, Horton showed courageous conduct in going over the stern during a heavy gale and cutting the fastenings of the ship's rudder chains.

== See also ==
- List of Medal of Honor recipients during peacetime
