= Henry A. Eilers =

Henry Anton Eilers
- Born: August 11, 1870; Newark, New Jersey, US
- Died: June 30, 1901 (aged 30); Philippines
- Burial place: Cypress Hills Cemetery Brooklyn, New York
- Military career
- Allegiance: United States
- Branch: United States Navy
- Rank: Gunner's Mate
- Units: USS Philadelphia (C-4); USS Kentucky (BB-6)
- Awards: Medal of Honor

Henry Anton Eilers (August 11, 1870 – June 30, 1901) was a gunner's mate serving in the United States Navy who received the Medal of Honor for bravery.

== Biography ==
Eilers was born August 11, 1870, in Newark, New Jersey and enlisted in the United States Navy in 1885. After joining the Navy he was stationed aboard the USS Philadelphia (C-4) as a gunner's mate. On September 17, 1892, the USS Philadelphia was participating in a mock attack on Fort McHenry, Baltimore, Maryland when a cartridge exploded prematurely. Hot embers blew down one of the ammunition chutes, nearly injuring three other members of the crew and causing others to run for their lives. Although the ammunition could have ignited at any time due to the hot embers Eilers risked his life to remain at his post in the magazine until all of the burning particles had been stamped out.

For his actions Eilers received the Medal of Honor on November 22, 1892.

In addition to the Medal of Honor Secretary of the Navy Benjamin F. Tracy issued General Order number 404 directing that Eilers be promoted to the rank of acting gunner for "extraordinary heroism". His date of rank as gunner was November 5, 1892.

He was assigned to the USS Kentucky (BB-6) on September 5, 1899 and was married sometime in the same year.

== Death and burial ==
While serving aboard the Kentucky in the Philippines on June 30, 1901, Eilers died of heart disease. His body was returned to the United States in September 1901 and buried a few days later in Cypress Hills Cemetery Brooklyn, New York.

== Medal of Honor citation ==
Rank and organization: Gunner's Mate, U.S. Navy. Born: 1871, Newark, N.J. Accredited to: New Jersey. G.O. No.: 404, 22 November 1892.

Citation:

On board the U.S.S. Philadelphia during the sham attack on Fort McHenry, Baltimore, Md., 17 September 1892. Displaying extraordinary heroism in the line of his profession on this occasion, Eilers remained at his post in the magazine and stamped out the burning particles of a prematurely exploded cartridge which had blown down the chute.

== See also ==
- List of Medal of Honor recipients in non-combat incidents
