= Charles S. Schepke =

United States Navy Medal of Honor recipient (1878–1933)

Charles Stephen Schepke
- Born: December 26, 1878; New York City, U.S.
- Died: February 27, 1933 (aged 54); Brooklyn, New York, U.S.
- Military career
- Allegiance: United States
- Branch: United States Navy
- Service years: 1895–1926
- Rank: Lieutenant
- Unit: USS Missouri (BB-11)
- Awards: Medal of Honor

Charles Stephen Schepke (December 26, 1878 – February 27, 1933) was a gunner's mate first class serving in the United States Navy who received the Medal of Honor for bravery.

== Biography ==
Charles S. Schepke was born December 26, 1878, in New York City, New York, and joined the United States Navy on May 14, 1895. He was stationed aboard the battleship USS Missouri (BB-11) as a gunner's mate first class.

On April 13, 1904, the Missouri was engaging in target practice when one of the ships 12" gun “flared back”. As the breech was opened for reloading, hot gases were released into the turret, causing it to catch fire. The fire spread to a bag of propellant and from there it spread down to the ammunition handling chamber. Schepke assisted in containing the fire before it spread to other areas of the ship and in putting out the blaze. The fire was eventually contained but, before it was out, 36 of the ship's crew had been killed. For his actions Schepke received the Medal of Honor on May 26, 1904.

He was warranted as a gunner on February 20, 1909, and was promoted to chief gunner on January 16, 1915. During World War I he received a temporary promotion to lieutenant on July 1, 1918.

In June 1921, a Brooklyn, New York judge granted alimony to Schepke's wife, Gertrude Schepke, pending a separation. She was granted a $25 week stipend after she filed for divorce from Lieutenant Schepke.

Schepke retired from the Navy on October 29, 1926.

Lieutenant Schepke died on February 27, 1933.

== Medal of Honor citation ==
Rank and organization: Gunner's Mate First Class, U.S. Navy. Born: 26 December 1878, New York, N.Y. Accredited to: New York. G.O. No.: 160, 26 May 1904.

Citation:

For extraordinary heroism while serving on the U.S.S. Missouri in remaining by a burning magazine and assisting to extinguish the fire, 13 April 1904.

== See also ==
- List of Medal of Honor recipients during peacetime
