= Albert Joseph Smith =

American Marine (1898–1973)

- Born: July 31, 1898; Calumet, Michigan
- Died: March 27, 1973 (aged 74); Detroit, Michigan
- Burial place: Grand Lawn Cemetery Detroit, Michigan
- Military career
- Allegiance: United States of America
- Branch: United States Marine Corps
- Service years: 1919-1922
- Rank: Sergeant
- Awards: Medal of Honor

Albert Joseph Smith (July 31, 1898–March 27, 1973) was a United States Marine who received the Medal of Honor for his actions in 1921 when he rescued a United States Navy sailor from a burning seaplane.

Smith joined the Marine Corps from Detroit in October 1919, and was honorably discharged 3 years later. He is buried in Grand Lawn Cemetery Detroit, Michigan.

== Medal of Honor citation ==
Rank and organization: Private, U.S. Marine Corps. Place and date: Marine Barracks, Naval Air Station, Pensacola, Fla., February 11, 1921. Entered service at: Michigan. Born: July 31, 1898, Calumet, Mich. G.O. No.: 72, September 29, 1921.

Citation:

At about 7:30 a.m. on the morning of February 11, 1921, Pvt. Smith, while on duty as a sentry, rescued Plen M. Phelps, late machinist's mate second class, United States Navy, from a burning seaplane which had fallen near his post, gate No. 1, Marine Barracks, Naval Air Station, Pensacola, Fla. Despite the explosion of the gravity gasoline tank, with total disregard of personal safety, he pushed himself to a position where he could reach Phelps, who was pinned beneath the burning wreckage, and rescued him from the burning plane, in the performance of which he sustained painful burns about the head, neck and both hands.

== See also ==
- List of Medal of Honor recipients during Peacetime
