= Patrick Francis Bresnahan =

- Born: May 1, 1872; Peabody, Massachusetts, US
- Died: January 29, 1940 (aged 67)
- Military career
- Allegiance: United States
- Branch: United States Navy
- Rank: Watertender
- Unit: USS Iowa (BB-4)
- Awards: Medal of Honor

Patrick Francis Bresnahan (May 1, 1872 – January 29, 1940) was a watertender serving in the United States Navy who received the Medal of Honor for bravery.

== Biography ==
Bresnahan was born May 1, 1872, in Peabody, Massachusetts and later joined the navy. He was stationed aboard the USS Iowa (BB-4) as a watertender. On January 25, 1905, a boiler plate blew out from boiler D. For his actions during the explosion he received the medal March 20, 1905.

He died January 29, 1940.

== Medal of Honor citation ==
Rank and organization: Watertender, U.S. Navy. Born: 1 May 1872, Peabody, Mass. Accredited to: Vermont. G.O. No.: 182, 20 March 1905.

Citation:

Serving on board the U.S.S. Iowa for extraordinary heroism at the time of the blowing out of the manhole plate of boiler D on board that vessel, 25 January 1905.

== See also ==
- List of Medal of Honor recipients in non-combat incidents
