= USS Tigress (1871) =

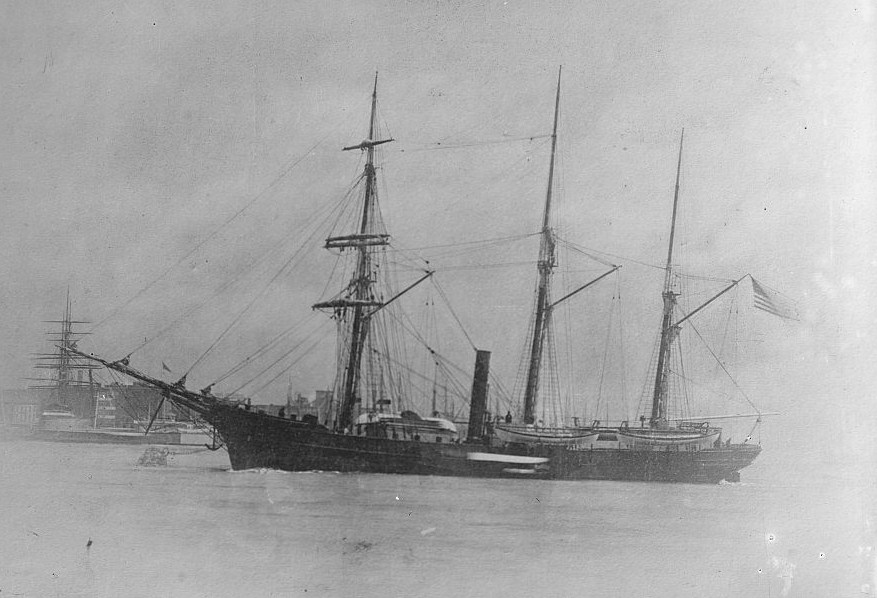
- USS Tigress in a New York yard preparing to search for the Polaris Expedition

History

United States
- Name: USS Tigress
- Builder: Harvey and Co., Quebec, Canada
- Launched: 1871
- Acquired: by charter, 1873
- Commissioned: 1873
- Decommissioned: 1873
- Fate: Returned to owner

General characteristics
- Type: Whaler
- Tonnage: 360 long tons (366 t)
- Length: 139 ft (42 m)
- Beam: 27 ft (8.2 m)
- Draft: 16 ft (4.9 m)
- Depth of hold: 16 ft 2 in (4.93 m)

The third USS Tigress was a screw steamer of the United States Navy, chartered during 1873 to mount an Arctic rescue mission.

== Service history ==
=== Whaler, 1871–1873 ===
Constructed in Quebec, Canada, by Harvey and Co. in 1871, she was originally a civilian whaler with a home port of Newfoundland. In May 1873 she was instrumental in the rescue of 19 members of the United States Navy Polaris expedition from an ice flow in Baffin Bay, and brought them into her home port, St. John's, Newfoundland, with the first reports of the loss of the expedition's ship, Polaris. She was so well-suited structurally for cruising icy Arctic waters that she was chartered by the United States Navy for service during the search for Polaris and the remainder of that ship's company. She was then manned by a Navy crew under the command of Cmdr. James A. Greer.

=== Searching for Polaris, July–November 1873 ===
Tigress' orders were to make her way as near to Polaris' last reported position and there to begin the main portion of the search. She cleared New York on 14 July, visited St. John's, and put in at Godhaven, Greenland, on 6 August for coal. Between 8 and 10 August, she moved from Godhaven to Upernavik where she took on coal and provisions from the sloop Juniata. The next day, the steamer headed north, following the Greenland shore as closely as she dared. On her way, she searched North Star Bay, Northumberland Island, and Hartstene Bay without success. On 14 August, she discovered the camp on Littleton Island at which the people from Polaris had passed the previous winter. From the natives then in possession of the camp, the searchers learned that the Polaris crew had departed the previous June in boats constructed of materials salvaged from the ship and that Polaris herself had sunk soon thereafter. Tigress' crew gathered what papers and instruments they found in the camp and reembarked.

On 16 August, the steamer shaped a course to the south and, following a stop at Melville Bay to communicate with the authorities at Tessuisak, reentered Godhaven on 25 August. After coaling from Juniata again Tigress resumed the search by crossing Baffin Bay and heading southward along the coast of Baffin Island to Cumberland Sound and back to the coast of Greenland. There, she searched the area between Ivigtut and Liskenaes. She searched the Davis Strait until 16 October when she had to put into St. Johns for coal. There, she learned that the rest of Polaris' crew had been rescued and had arrived in Scotland. After a fortnight in port, Tigress cleared St. John's on 30 October and, on 9 November, returned to New York where she was returned to her civilian crew.
