= USS Huron (1875) =

Gunboat of the United States Navy

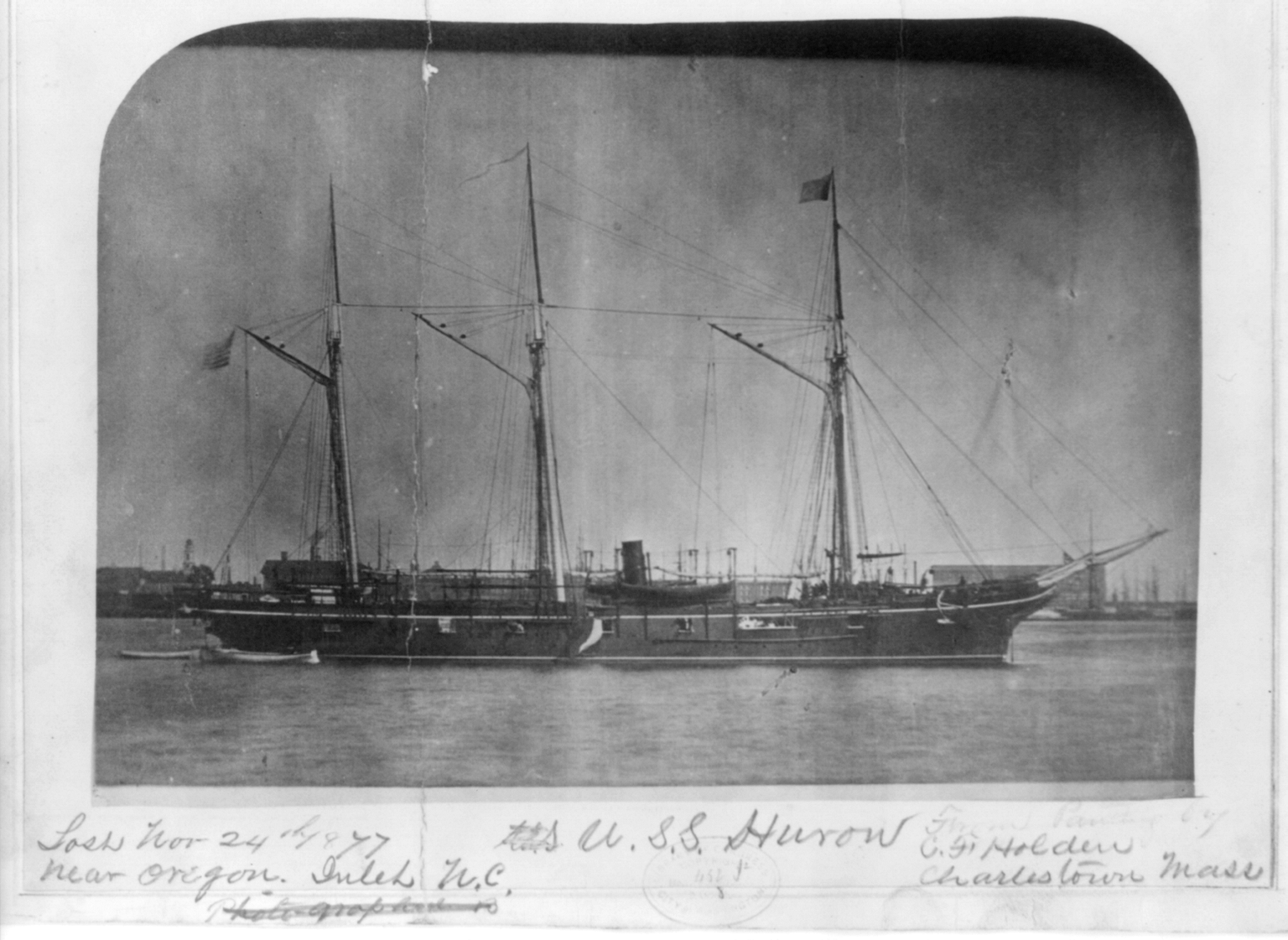
- U. S. S. Huron, which was lost Nov. 24, 1877 near Oregon Inlet, North Carolina

History

United States
- Name: USS Huron
- Namesake: Lake Huron
- Builder: John Roach & Sons
- Laid down: 1873
- Launched: 1875
- Commissioned: 15 November 1875
- Fate: Wrecked 24 November 1877
- Notes: 98 of crew lost; 34 saved

General characteristics
- Class & type: Gunboat
- Displacement: 1,020 long tons (1,040 t)
- Length: 175 ft (53 m)
- Beam: 32 ft (9.8 m)
- Depth of hold: 15 ft (4.6 m)
- Armament: 1 × 11 in (280 mm) Dahlgren gun, 2 × 9 in (230 mm) Dahlgren guns, 1 × 60 pdr (27 kg) Parrott rifle, 1 × 12 pdr (5.4 kg) howitzer, 1 × Gatling gun
- USS Huron
- U.S. National Register of Historic Places
- Location within North Carolina Location within the United States
- Nearest city: Nags Head, North Carolina
- Coordinates: 35.97751°N 75.63092°W
- Area: 1.6 acres (0.65 ha)
- Built: 1877
- Architect: Delaware River Shipbuilding Co.
- Architectural style: Alert-class Sloop of War
- NRHP reference No.: 91001625
- Added to NRHP: 15 November 1991

USS Huron was an iron-hulled gunboat of the United States Navy. She was a screw steamer with full-rig auxiliary sail, built by John Roach & Sons in Chester, Pennsylvania from 1873 to 1875 and commissioned at Philadelphia Navy Yard on 15 November 1875.

== Service history ==
Huron arrived on 11 December 1875 for duty at the Norfolk Navy Yard, and spent the next two years cruising in the Caribbean and the Gulf of Mexico. She stopped at Veracruz and Key West on her first cruise, returning to Port Royal on 4 August 1876 and visited many Caribbean and Venezuelan ports from March–June 1877.

=== Loss ===
After repairs at New York Navy Yard in August, the ship sailed to Hampton Roads, and departed on 23 November 1877 for a scientific cruise on the coast of Cuba. Soon after her departure, Huron ran aground off Nags Head, North Carolina in heavy weather, and was wrecked shortly after 1 a.m. next morning. For a time, her crew worked in relatively little danger, attempting to free their ship, but she soon heeled over, carrying 98 officers and men to their deaths. Of the fatalities 83 remains were recovered and buried; of which the remains of 8 officers and 61 men were identified while 14 others could not be identified.

Today, the Huron wreck can be dived (Scuba or free dived) from shore. The wreck is often marked with a buoy during the summer months.

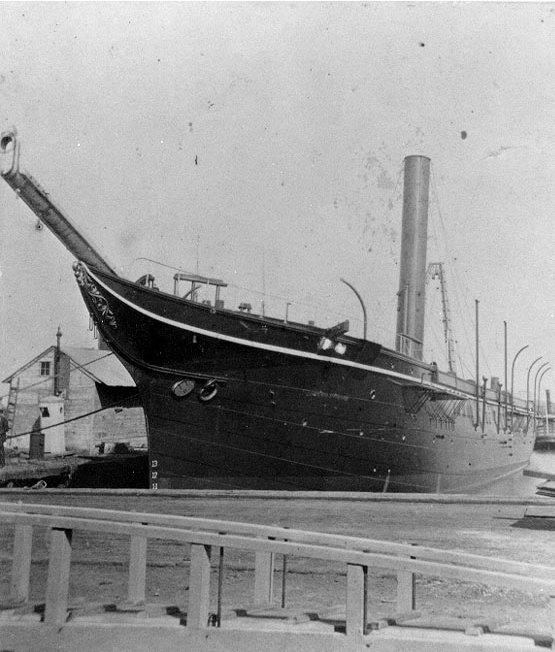
An Alert class gunboat, possibly Huron, under construction at the shipyard of John Roach & Sons, c. 1874-75.

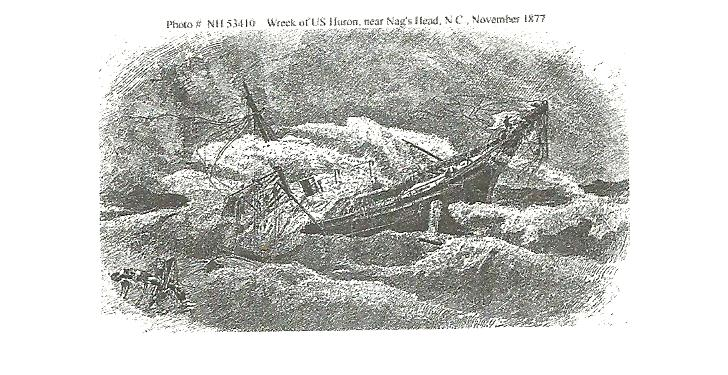
1881 engraving of the wreck of the USS Huron.

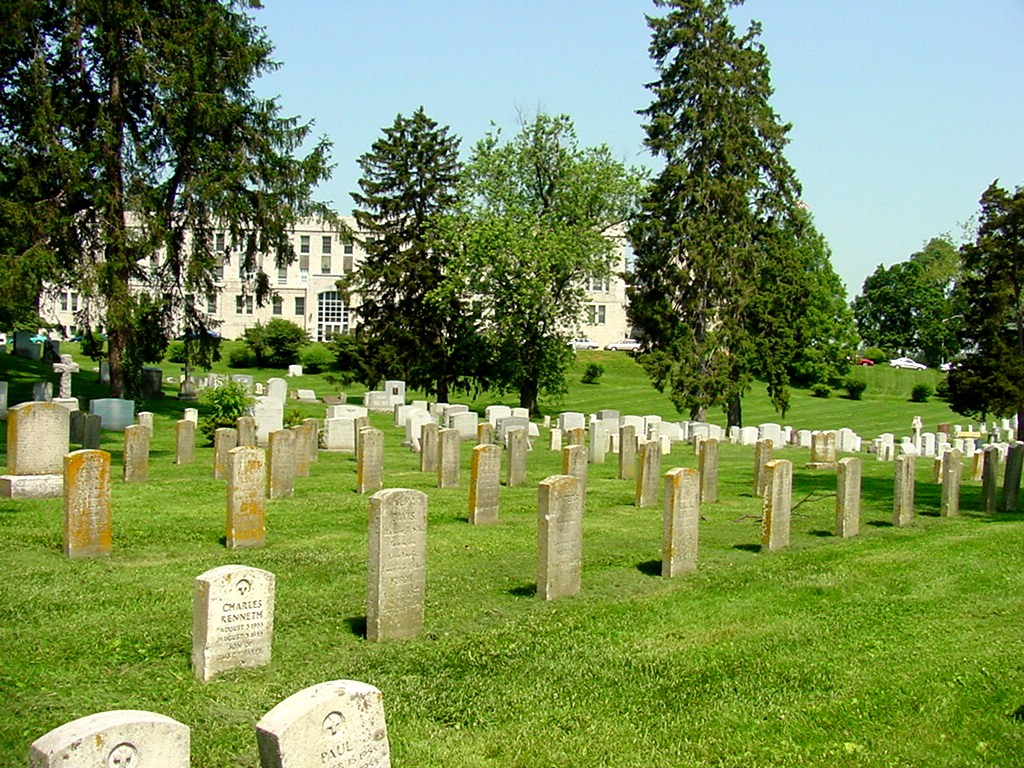
Huron graves at the United States Naval Academy Cemetery, Annapolis Maryland
