= Gunner's mate =

United States Navy and United States Coast Guard rating

Gunner's Mate
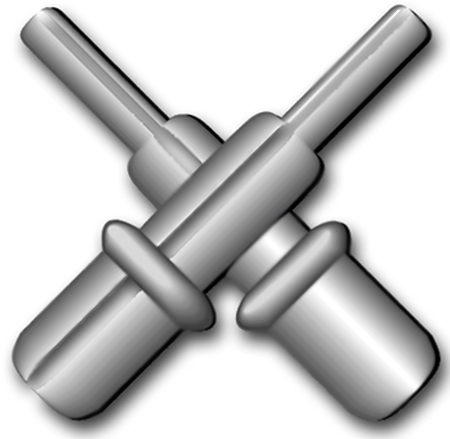
- Rating insignia
- Issued by: United States Navy, United States Coast Guard
- Type: Enlisted rating (Seamen)
- Abbreviation: GM "Non Solis Radios Sed Iovis Fulmina Mitto." (I send forth not the rays of the sun, but the thunderbolts of Jove)
- Specialty: Small Arms, Torpedoes, Vertical Launching Systems (VLS), Ordnance, Gun Mount Systems, 5" Gun Systems, and Magazine Sprinkler Systems

The United States Navy and United States Coast Guard occupational rating of gunner's mate (GM) is a designation given by the Bureau of Naval Personnel (BUPERS) to enlisted sailors who either satisfactorily complete initial Gunner's Mate "A" school training, or who "strike" for the rating by showing competence in the field of ordnance. When "striking," a sailor is not required to be a seaman, but must belong to one of three undesignated rates: Fireman (FN), Seaman (SN), or Airman (AN). It is also possible to cross rate to Gunner's Mate. Cross rating refers to the act of an enlisted sailor "crossing" from their current rating to another rating of their choice, provided their ASVAB scores are high enough and there are open slots for the rate.

The Gunner's Mate "A" school is held at Naval Training Center Great Lakes, Illinois and Yorktown, VA for the USCG. In its early years, the school was very hands-on, but it is now primarily conducted through technical educational tools, such as self-study computer-based training (CBT). Training focuses on the operation, maintenance, and troubleshooting of naval guns, missile launchers and torpedoes as well as a strong emphasis on basic explosives, guidance and tracking systems, small arms, Naval ammunition classification, and safety. Upon completion of this basic training, enlisted members often continue on to a specialized "C" school, where they learn a particular weapons system.

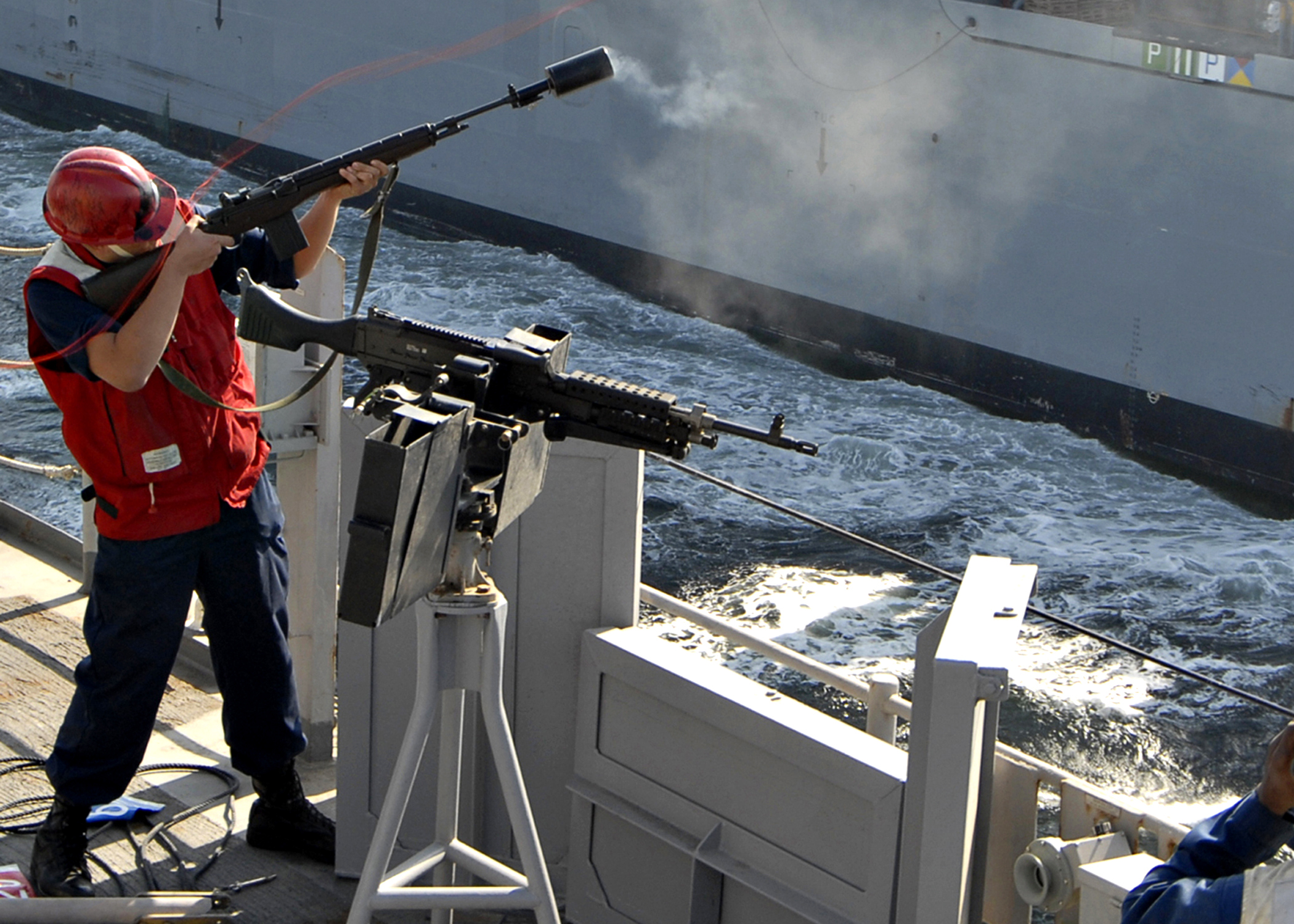
A Gunner's Mate fires a shot line with an M14 rifle from the USS Carter Hall to USNS Lewis and Clark.

A GM will specialize in a multitude of weapons varieties; arms such as, shotguns, semiautomatic and automatic rifles, pistols, submachine guns, machine guns, explosives, both portable and large-scale, mounted weapons systems, and various rockets, torpedoes, and missiles. A GM may care for and assist in operating shooting ranges, armories, and the storage and maintenance of arms.

On February 26, 2007, the Chief of Naval Operations approved the merger of the gunner's mate (GM) and torpedoman's mate (TM) ratings into the GM rating. The move was made to leverage the strengths, knowledge, skills and abilities found in the two ratings to meet existing and future strategic mission needs.

“The training sailors receive after basic training for their ratings on an apprentice level has been the same for both gunner's and torpedomen's mates,” said Senior Chief Torpedoman's Mate, Sherry Secrease of the Navy Personnel Command. “This makes the merger easier to accomplish.”

The Gunner's Mate rating is primarily for surface warfare. Closely associated Naval occupational ratings are Fire Controlman (FC), Aviation Ordnanceman (AO), Missile Technician (MT), Mineman (MN). The Gunner's Mate rating is authorized by the Naval Armament Act of 1794. The others include Boatswain's Mate (BM), Quartermasters (QM), Master-at-Arms (MA), and Yeoman (YN). The rating is also among the top five source ratings for enlisted Naval Special Warfare candidates.
