= Ordinary seaman (rank) =

Naval military rank

Ordinary seaman is a military rank used in naval forces.

== United Kingdom ==
In the Royal Navy in the middle of the 18th century, the term ordinary seaman was used to refer to a seaman with between one and two years' experience at sea, who showed enough seamanship to be so rated by their captain. A seaman with less than a year's experience was referred to as a landsman. One with more than two years' experience and considered "well acquainted with his duty" was referred to as an able seaman.

Later, the term was formalized as a rating for the lowest normal grade of seaman. They are not trained in any special task. They are required to work at physically hard tasks of great variety. One needs an Ordinary Seaman Certificate to obtain work. One can become an able seaman as a promotion from this position.

In the modern Royal Navy the rank of Able Seaman is achieved by all recruits on completion of basic training (HMS Raleigh) and subsequent intensive training in the specialisation of choice. Thus the rank of Ordinary Seaman is obsolete. This is in line with increasing technical specialisation and ability of RN personnel.

== United States ==
Ordinary seaman was the second-lowest rank of the 19th century United States Navy, ranking above landsman and below seaman. Promotion from landsman to ordinary seaman required three years of experience or re-enlistment. An ordinary seaman who gained six years of experience and "knew the ropes", that is, knew the name and use of every line in the ship's rigging, could be promoted to seaman. An ordinary seaman's duties aboard ship included "handling and splicing lines, and working aloft on the lower mast stages and yards."

The rank existed from 1797 to 1917, when it was renamed "seaman second class". Seaman second class was later changed to the modern-day rank of seaman apprentice. The related ranks of ordinary seaman second class and ordinary seaman, engineer's force, existed in 1876–1885 and 1871–1883, respectively. The term is still in use in the United States Merchant Marine for entry-level deck personnel; the common abbreviation is OS.

== Other countries ==
The term ordinary seaman is currently used in the Irish Naval Service.

In the Royal Canadian Navy, the rank of sailor third class (previously ordinary seaman until August 2020) may be further qualified by the suffix "(B)" or "(R)." The "(R)" indicates a recruit undergoing basic training, and is dropped on successful graduation from CFLRS Saint-Jean, the Canadian military's all-services recruit training centre. The "(B)" suffix is then appended while the sailor undergoes seamanship training, initial trade training and onboard qualification. Once fully qualified to stand watches, the "(B)" is struck from the rank abbreviation.

== Bibliography ==
- Lavery, Brian (1989). Nelson's Navy: The Ships, Men and Organisation, 1793-1815. Conway Maritime Press. ISBN 0851775217.
- N.A.M. Roger. The Wooden World: An Anatomy of the Georgian Navy. W.W. Norton and Company, 1986.
