= USS Tallapoosa (1863) =

Gunboat of the United States Navy

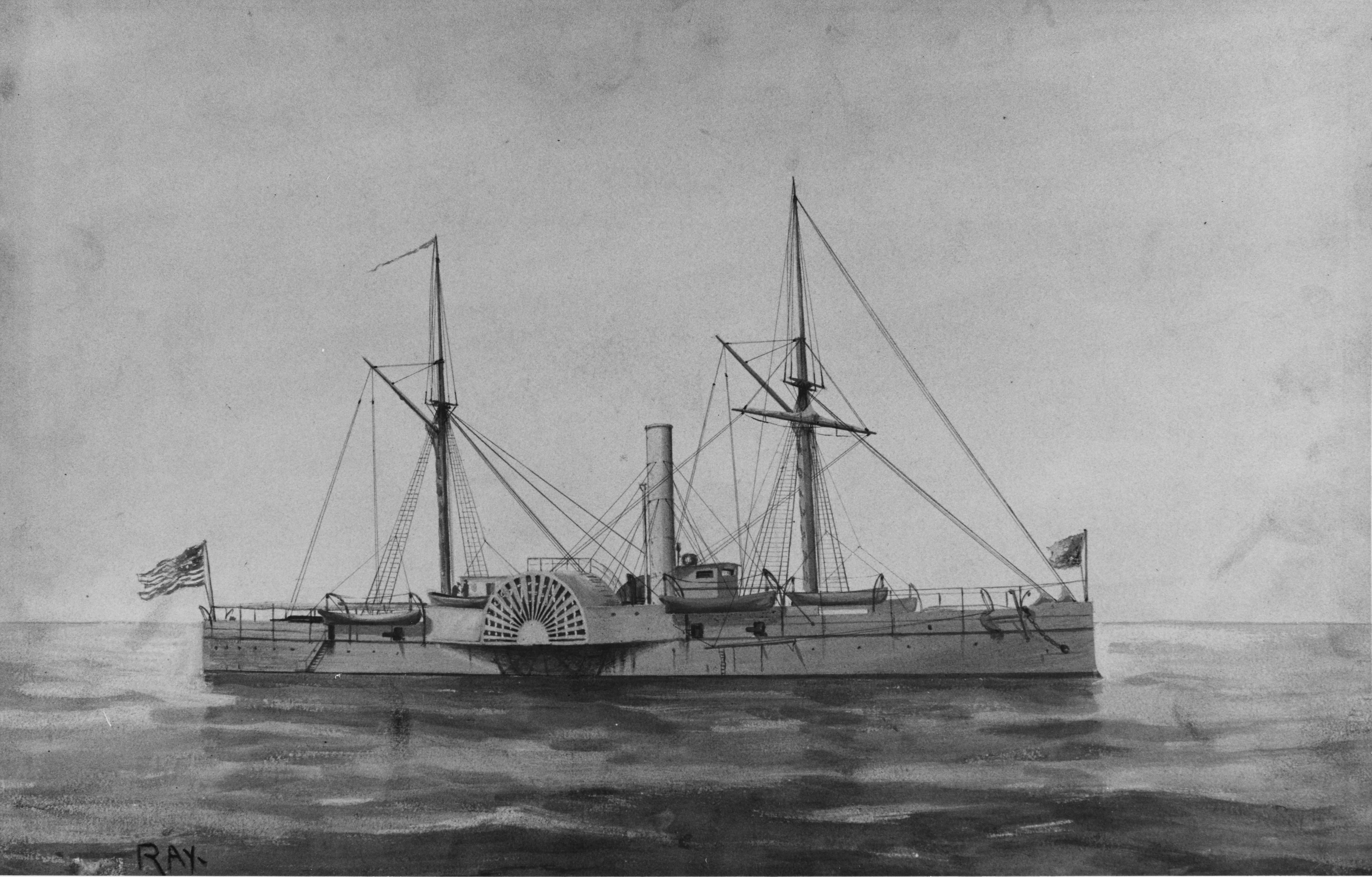
- Wash drawing by Clary Ray, circa 1900, depicting Tallapoosa as she appeared during the American Civil War.

History

United States
- Name: USS Tallapoosa
- Namesake: A navigable river which rises in Paulding County in northwestern Georgia
- Builder: New York Navy Yard
- Laid down: date unknown
- Launched: 17 February 1863
- Commissioned: 13 September 1864
- Decommissioned: circa 30 January 1892
- Fate: Sold at Montevideo, Uruguay, on 3 March 1892

General characteristics
- Class & type: Sassacus-class gunboat
- Displacement: 974 tons
- Length: 205 ft (62 m)
- Beam: 35 ft (11 m)
- Draft: 6 ft 6 in (1.98 m)
- Depth of hold: 11 ft 6 in (3.51 m)
- Propulsion: steam engine; side wheel-propelled
- Speed: 11.5 knots (21.3 km/h; 13.2 mph)
- Complement: 190 officers and enlisted
- Armament: two 100-pounder Parrott rifles; four 9" Dahlgren smoothbores; two 20-pounder Parrott rifles; two 24-pounder howitzers
- Notes: double ended

USS Tallapoosa was a wooden-hulled, double-ended steamer in the United States Navy during the American Civil War. She was outfitted with heavy guns for intercepting blockade runners and howitzers for shore bombardment.

Tallapoosa remained in service after the war and served in various capacities, including schoolship for midshipmen of the United States Naval Academy. She was sold in Uruguay in 1892.

== Built by the New York Navy Yard ==
Tallapoosa – the first U.S. Navy ship to have that name—was built at the New York Navy Yard by C. W. Booz of Baltimore, Maryland on similar plans as Sassacus. She was launched on 17 February 1863 and commissioned on 13 September 1864, Lieutenant Commander Joseph E. DeHaven in command.

== Civil War service ==
=== Searching for CSS Tallahassee ===
As Tallapoosa was being fitted out, Confederate cruiser Tallahassee was cruising off the Atlantic coast destroying Union shipping from the Virginia Capes to Nova Scotia. Hence, the Union double-ender got underway late in October and spent her first days at sea in seeking the Southern commerce raider.

Her quest took her from New York City to Halifax, then south to the Virginia Capes, then back north again to the coast of Nova Scotia. On 4 November, Tallapoosa encountered a southeasterly gale, which battered the ship for the next two days, disabled both her rudders, and caused other damage. She finally made port at Boston, Massachusetts on the morning of the 7th.

=== Assigned to the East Gulf blockade ===
Following repairs at the Boston Navy Yard which lasted over a month and one-half, Tallapoosa was assigned to the East Gulf Blockading Squadron. Her most notable duty during this assignment occurred on 11 January 1865 when she assisted in salvaging material and equipment from screw frigate San Jacinto which had run aground in the Bahamas on an uncharted reef near Green Turtle Cay off Grand Abaco Island.

== Post-war service ==
After the American Civil War ended, Tallapoosa served in the Gulf Squadron—cruising in the West Indies and the Gulf of Mexico—until 1867 when she was laid up at the Washington Navy Yard.

=== Admiral Farragut on board ===
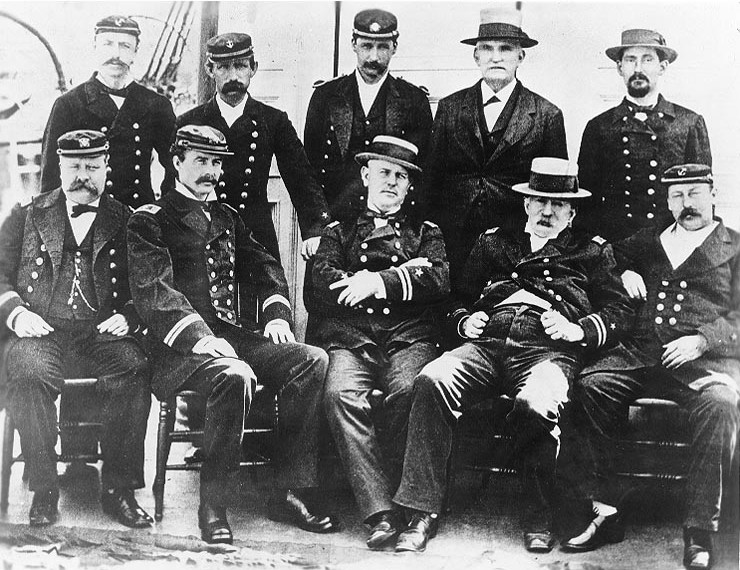
Tallapoosa's officers, 1873. Her commanding officer, Lieutenant David G. McRitchie, is seated in the center.

Reactivated in 1869, the ship became a dispatch vessel, beginning a role which soon brought Tallapoosa one of her more interesting missions. In January 1870, she carried Admiral David Farragut to Portland, Maine, where he met HMS Monarch at the end of that British turreted battleship's voyage across the Atlantic Ocean to return to the United States the remains of philanthropist George Peabody who had died in England.

Early the following summer, the double-ender carried Farragut from New York City to Portsmouth, New Hampshire, to visit the commandant of the navy yard. It was hoped that the cool sea breezes of New England would improve the aged and ailing admiral's health. As Tallapoosa neared Portsmouth on 4 July, she fired an Independence Day salute to her famous passenger, the Navy's highest ranking and most respected officer. Upon hearing the warship's guns, Farragut left his sick-bed, donned his uniform, and walked to the man-of-war's quarterdeck. There he commented, "It would be well if I died now, in harness. ..." A month and 10 days later, Farragut died at Portsmouth.

=== Schoolship for the Naval Academy ===
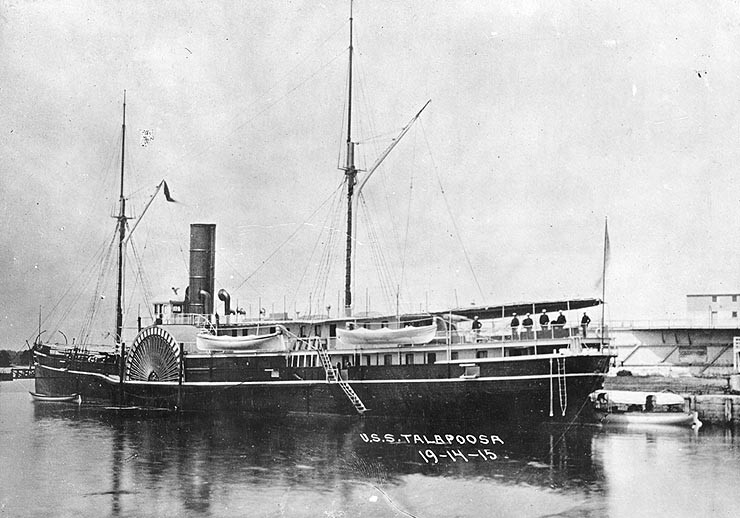
At the Portsmouth Navy Yard, Kittery, Maine, circa 1886, following her final rebuilding.

In 1872, Tallapoosa moved to Annapolis, Maryland, to serve as a training ship at the United States Naval Academy. The following year, she became a transport. While she performed this duty, her years of service began to show, and it became apparent that she needed extensive repair work. Hence, the ship was largely rebuilt at Baltimore, Maryland, in 1874 and 1875. There, revitalized and configured as a single-ender, the veteran warship resumed her role as a dispatch vessel and continued performing as such for almost a decade.

=== Raised after sinking ===
Shortly before midnight on 24 August 1884, Tallapoosa collided with schooner J. S. Lowell in Vineyard Sound and sank about 5 nautical miles (9.3 km; 5.8 mi) from Vineyard Haven, Massachusetts. After the ship had been raised and repaired by the Merritt Wrecking Company, she was recommissioned at the New York Navy Yard on 11 January 1886. Assigned to the South Atlantic Squadron, Tallapoosa departed New York on 7 June 1886, bound for Rio de Janeiro.

== Sold in Uruguay ==
Tallapoosa served along the coast of South America until 30 January 1892 when she was condemned as unfit for further service. She was sold at public auction at Montevideo, Uruguay, on 3 March 1892.

== See also ==
- Confederate States Navy
- Union Navy
