= Landsman (rank) =

Military rank for naval recruits

Landsman or landman (the latter being an older term) was a military rank given to naval recruits.

== United Kingdom ==
In the Royal Navy in the middle of the 18th century (c. 1757), the term "landsman" referred to a seaman with less than a year's experience at sea. After a year, a landsman was usually rated as an ordinary seaman.

Most were acquired by impressment (a common method of recruitment from c. 1700–1815). Landsmen were usually between the ages of 16 and 35, while seasoned sailors (who started as ordinary seamen) could be impressed up to the ages of 50 to 55 depending on need. In 1853, with the abolition of impressment after the passing of the Continuous Service Act, the rank's title was changed to "apprentice seaman". The term "landsman" evolved into a more formal rating for a seaman assigned to unskilled manual labour.

Landsmen's unfamiliarity with shipboard life routinely made them unpopular with the more experienced members of their vessel's crew. Throughout the eighteenth century, problems with unsanitary conduct, brawling and poor self-discipline among landsmen sometimes necessitated the stationing of Royal Marine guards below decks in order to prevent attacks by their shipmates.

== United States ==
"Landsman" was the lowest rate of the United States Navy in the 19th and early 20th centuries; it was given to new recruits with little or no experience at sea. Landsmen performed menial, unskilled work aboard ship. A landsman who gained three years of experience or re-enlisted could be promoted to ordinary seaman. The rate existed from 1838 to 1921.
