= List of sloops of war of the United States Navy =

Ships of the United States Navy

Ships in current service
- Current ships

Ships grouped alphabetically
- A–B; C; D–F; G–H; I–K; L; M; N–O; P; Q–R; S; T–V; W–Z

Ships grouped by type
- Aircraft carriers; Airships; Amphibious warfare ships; Auxiliaries; Battlecruisers; Battleships; Cruisers; Destroyers; Destroyer escorts; Destroyer leaders; Escort carriers; Frigates; Hospital ships; Littoral combat ships; Mine warfare vessels; Monitors; Oilers; Patrol vessels; Registered civilian vessels; Sailing frigates; Steam frigates; Steam gunboats; Ships of the line; Sloops of war; Submarines; Torpedo boats; Torpedo retrievers; Unclassified miscellaneous; Yard and district craft

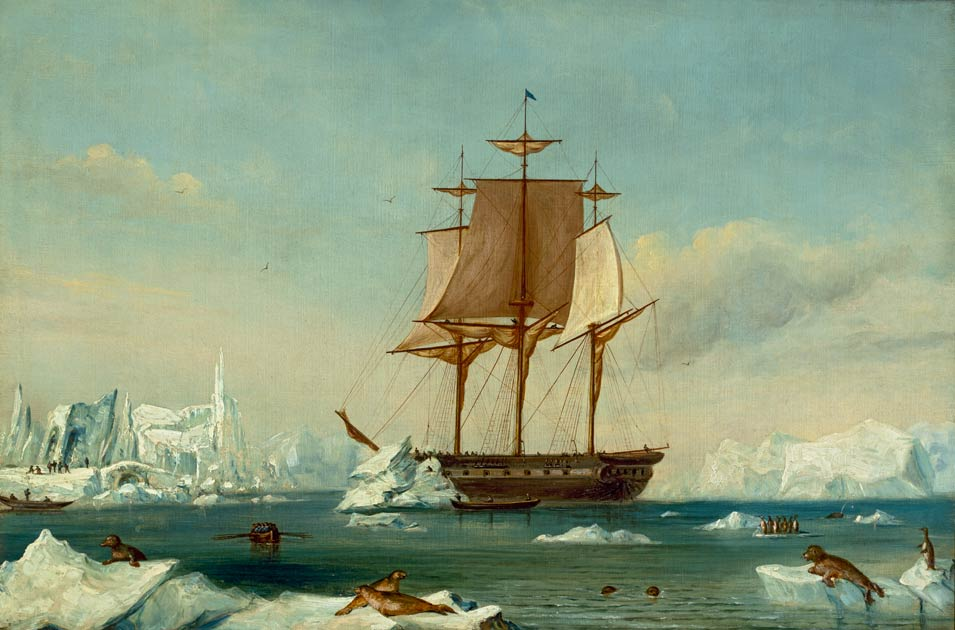
USS Vincennes

This is a list of sloops of war of the United States Navy.

== Sailing sloops of war ==
- USS Adams (1799), scuttled 3 September 1814 to prevent capture
- USS Albany (1846), lost after 28–29 September 1854 with approx. 197 aboard
- USS Alligator (1813), captured 14 December 1814
- USS Belle Italia (1862)
- USS Boston (1825), wrecked 15 November 1846, no fatalities
- USS Brockenborough (1862), wrecked 27 May 1863
- USS Concord (1828), wrecked 2 November 1842, 3 killed
- USS Constellation (1854)
- USS Cyane (1837)
- USS Dale (1839)
- USS Decatur (1839)
- USS Eagle (1812)
- USS Epervier (1814), lost in July or August 1815 with 134 aboard
- USS Erie (1813)
- USS Fair American (1812)
- USS Fairfield (1828)
- USS Falmouth (1827)
- USS Fly (1776), burned to prevent capture November 1777
- USS Frolic (1813), captured 20 April 1814
- USS G. L. Brockenborough (1862), wrecked 27 May 1863
- USS Ganges (1794)
- USS Germantown (1846), scuttled 20 April 1861
- USS Granite (1862)
- USS Growler (1812 sloop)
- USS Hamilton (1812), foundered 8 August 1813, 42 killed
- USS Hornet (1775), captured 27 April 1777
- USS Hornet (1805 sloop)
- USS Hornet (1805 brig), foundered with the loss of all hands 10 September 1829
- USS Independence (1776 sloop), wrecked 24 April 1778
- USS Jamestown (1844)
- USS Julia (1863)
- USS Levant (1837), lost with all hands after 18 September 1860
- USS Lexington (1825)
- USS Louisiana (1812)
- USS Marion (1839)
- USS Maryland (1799)
- USS Natchez (1827)
- USS Ohio (1812), captured 12 August 1814
- USS Ontario (1813)
- USS Peacock (1813)
- USS Peacock (1828), wrecked 17–19 July 1841, no fatalities
- USS Plymouth (1844)
- USS Portsmouth (1843)
- USS Preble (1839), burned and exploded 27 April 1863
- USS President (1812), captured 1814
- USS Providence (1775), destroyed to prevent capture 14 August 1779
- USS Rosalie (1863)
- USS Saratoga (1842)
- USS Scourge (1804)
- USS Scourge (1812), foundered 8 August 1813, 42 killed
- USS St. Louis (1828)
- USS St. Mary's (1844)
- USS Ticonderoga (1814)
- USS Trippe (1812), captured October 1813
- USS Trumbull (1799)
- USS Vandalia (1828)
- USS Vincennes (1826)
- USS Warren (1827)
- USS Wasp (1807), captured 15 October 1812
- USS Wasp (1813)
- USS Wasp (1814), lost with all hands October 1814
- USS Yorktown (1839), wrecked 6 September 1850, no fatalities

== Steam sloops of war ==
=== Marion class ===
- USS Marion (1839)

=== Saranac class ===
- USS Saranac (1848), wrecked 18 June 1875, no fatalities

=== Dacotah class ===
- USS Dacotah (1859)

=== Seminole class ===
- USS Seminole (1859)
- USS Narragansett (1859)

=== Saginaw class ===
- USS Saginaw (1859), wrecked 29 October 1870 at Kure Atoll, 4 later killed while sailing for help

=== Pocahontas class ===
- USS Pocahontas (1852)

=== Hartford class ===
- USS Brooklyn (1858)
- USS Hartford (1858)
- USS Richmond (1860)
- USS Lancaster (1858)
- USS Pensacola (1859)

=== Mohican class ===
- USS Kearsarge (1861), wrecked 2 February 1894, no fatalities
- USS Mohican (1859)
- USS Iroquois (1859)
- USS Oneida (1861), sunk in collision 24 January 1870, 125 killed
- USS Tuscarora (1861)
- USS Wachusett (1861)
- USS Wyoming (1859)

=== Contoocook class ===
- USS Contoocook (1864) renamed USS Albany
- USS Manitou (1866) renamed USS Worcester
- USS Mosholu (1867) renamed USS Severn
- USS Pushmataha renamed USS Cambridge and USS Congress (1868)
- USS Pompanoosuc (not launched)

=== Ossipee class ===
- USS Ossipee (1861)
- USS Adirondack (1861), wrecked 23 August 1862, no fatalities
- USS Juniata (1862)
- USS Housatonic (1861), sunk by submarine 17 February 1864, 5 killed

=== Sacramento class ===
- USS Canandaigua (1862)
- USS Monongahela (1862)
- USS Sacramento (1862), wrecked 19 June 1867, no fatalities
- USS Shenandoah (1862)

=== Ticonderoga class ===
- USS Ticonderoga (1863)
- USS Lackawanna (1862)

=== Algoma-class ===
- USS Alaska (1868)
- USS Benicia (1868) formerly USS Algoma
- USS Plymouth (1867) formerly USS Kenosha
- USS Omaha (1869) formerly USS Astoria

=== Swatara class ===
- USS Resaca (1865)
- USS Swatara (1865)
- USS Quinnebaug (1866)
- USS Nantasket (1867)

=== Galena class ===
- USS Mohican (1883)
- USS Quinnebaug (1875)
- USS Swatara (1873)

=== Vandalia class ===
- USS Vandalia (1876), wrecked during the Apia cyclone at Samoa 16 March 1889, 43 killed
- USS Mohican (1883)

=== Adams class ===
- USS Enterprise (1874)
- USS Adams (1874)
- USS Alliance (1877)
- USS Nipsic, rebuilt 1879, wrecked during the Apia cyclone at Samoa 16 March 1889, 8 killed, rebuilt
- USS Essex (1876), later classified as IX-10

=== Alert class ===
- USS Alert (1875), later classified as AS-4
- USS Huron (1875), wrecked 24 November 1877, 98 killed
- USS Ranger (1876), later classified as PG-23, IX-18
