= USS Detroit =

USS Detroit may refer to:

- USS Detroit (1813), a 20-gun ship captured from the British during the Battle of Lake Erie, 10 September 1813, laid up almost immediately, and sold in 1825.
- USS Canandaigua (1862) was a Sacramento-class sloop named Detroit from 15 May to 10 August in 1869.
- Detroit, a planned Algoma-class sloop, was cancelled in 1866
- USS Detroit (C-10) was a cruiser in use from 1893 to 1904
- USS Detroit (CL-8) was a light cruiser in service from 1923 to 1946
- USS Detroit (AOE-4) was a fast combat support ship commissioned in 1970 and decommissioned in 2005
- USS Detroit (LCS-7) is a Freedom-class littoral combat ship launched in 2014 and decommissioned in 2023.
