= USS Omaha =

Four ships of the United States Navy have been named USS Omaha after the city of Omaha, Nebraska:

- USS Omaha (1869), an Algoma-class screw sloop commissioned in 1872; served in Atlantic and Asiatic Squadrons, scrapped in 1914
- USS Omaha (CL-4), lead ship of the Omaha-class light cruisers, commissioned in 1923; served during World War II, scrapped in 1946
- USS Omaha (SSN-692), a Los Angeles-class submarine commissioned in 1978; decommissioned in 1995, scrapped in 2012
- USS Omaha (LCS-12), an Independence-class littoral combat ship commissioned in 2012
