= USS Gem of the Sea =

Gunboat of the United States Navy

History

United States
- Acquired: 3 August 1861
- Commissioned: 15 October 1861
- Decommissioned: 24 February 1865
- Fate: Sold, May 1865

General characteristics
- Tonnage: 371
- Length: 116 ft (35 m)
- Beam: 26 ft 3 in (8.00 m)
- Depth of hold: 13 ft 5 in (4.09 m)
- Propulsion: sail
- Complement: 65
- Armament: six 32-pounder guns

USS Gem of the Sea was a bark acquired by the Union Navy during the American Civil War. She was used by the Navy to patrol navigable waterways of the Confederacy to prevent the South from trading with other countries.

== Service history ==
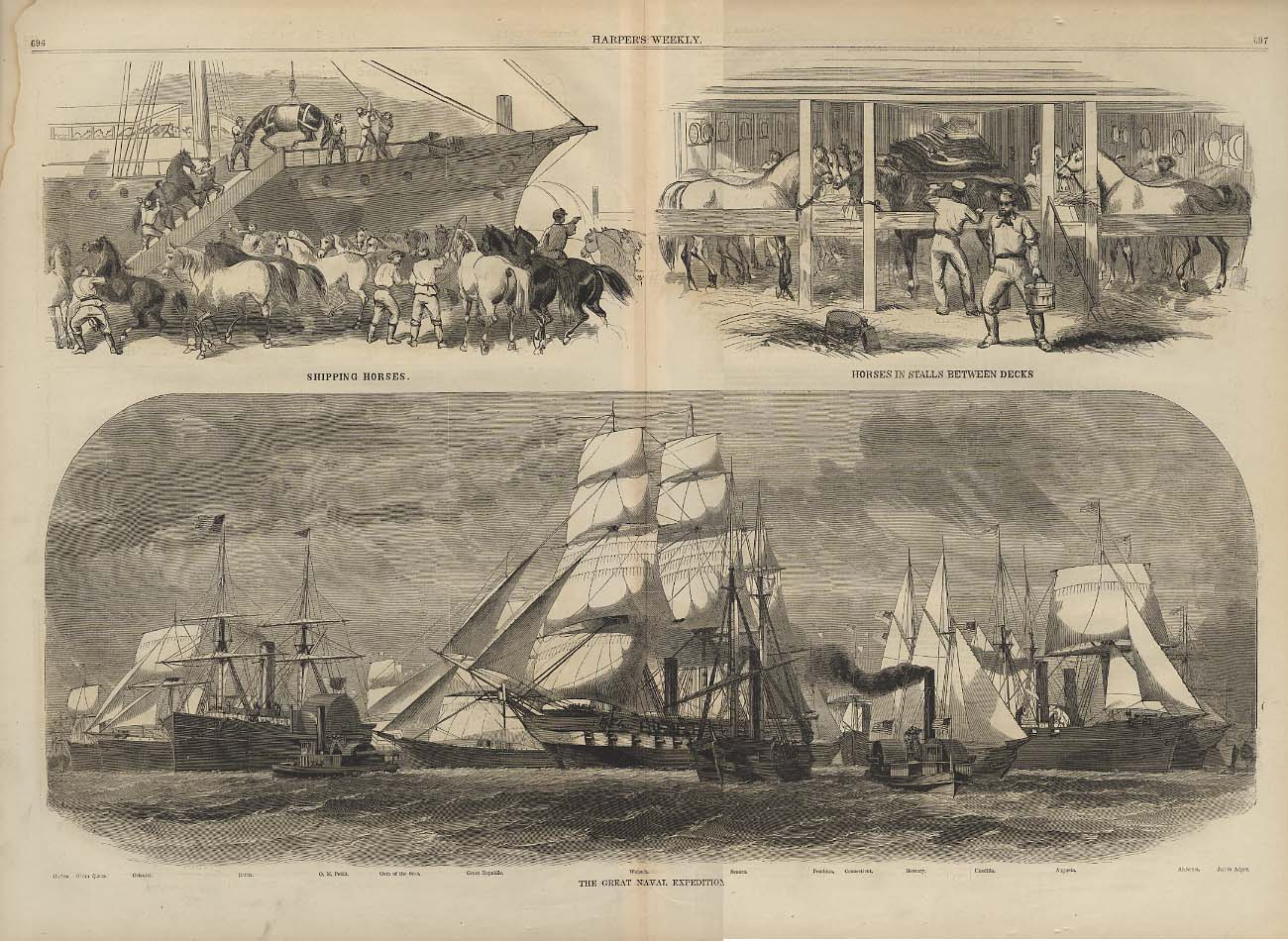
Gem of the Sea with the Great Naval Expedition, Harper's Weekly, 1861

Gem of the Sea was purchased at New York City from Galway & Teller 3 August 1861; and commissioned 15 October, Acting Volunteer Lt. Irvin B. Baxter in command. She departed New York 20 October 1861 to serve the South Atlantic Blockading Squadron off the coast of South Carolina. She ran British blockade runner Prince of Wales aground off Georgetown 24 December. She captured blockade runner Fair Play 12 March 1862, schooner Dixie 15 April 1862, and schooner Mary Stewart 3 June. Nine days later she took schooner Seabrook off Alligator Creek. On 1 July she took possession of four rice-laden lighters up the Waccamaw River. Gem of the Sea returned to the Boston Navy Yard 18 October 1862 for repairs. Ordered to the East Gulf Coast Blockading Squadron, she arrived at Key West, Florida, 18 December 1862 to guard the coast.

She captured sloop Ann off Jupiter Inlet 30 December 1862, a small, unidentified schooner 12 January 1863, a small boat 28 January, and schooner Charm in the Indian River Inlet 23 February. In the same vicinity, she captured sloop Peter, and British blockade runners Maggie Fulton and Inez. British schooner George was taken in the Sanibal River 29 July; and sloop Richard fell into her hands in Peace Creek 31 August. In an expedition up the same creek 5 September, she destroyed the buildings and four boats of noted blockade runner Johnson. Thereafter she captured British schooner Director 30 September and sloop Matilda 21 October. From 24 to 30 December 1863, she was part of an expedition up the Myakka River, transporting refugee rangers from Useppa Island to the mainland.

Gem of the Sea spent her remaining career patrolling off Charlotte Harbor, Florida. She joined her tender Rosalie in capturing steamer Emma off nearby Malco Inlet 11 June 1864. She departed Charlotte Harbor 2 February 1865 and entered the Philadelphia Navy Yard the 22d. She decommissioned 24 February and was sold 6 May 1865 to A. C. Purvis & Sons, Philadelphia, Pennsylvania.
