= Connecticut (disambiguation) =

Connecticut is a state in the United States.

Connecticut may also refer to:

- Connecticut Avenue, a street in Washington, D.C.
- Connecticut College, a private liberal arts college
- University of Connecticut, the largest public university in the state
  - Connecticut Huskies, the athletic program of the University of Connecticut
- Connecticut Colony, an English colony located in British America
- Connecticut River, a tributary of Long Island Sound
- SS Connecticut (1938), a tanker sunk in 1942
- SS Connecticut, a tanker saved from sinking by USCGC Venturous and other ships in 1970
- USS Connecticut, any of seven US Navy ships named for the state
- Connecticut (sculpture), 1980s sculpture by Paul DiPasquale
