= Hugh King =

Hugh King may refer to:

- Hugh King (Medal of Honor) (1845–?), United States Navy sailor and Medal of Honor recipient

== See also ==
- Hugh F. Locke King, British entrepreneur
