= Sacramento-class sloop =

American screw sloops (1862–1883)

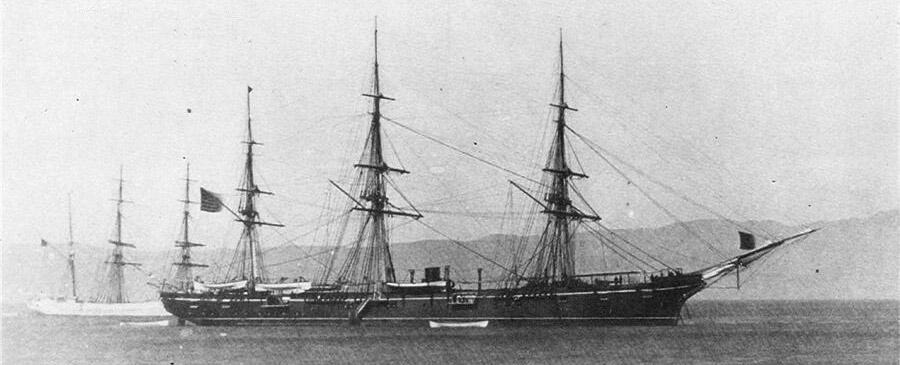
- USS Lackawanna likely in 1880

Class overview
- Name: Sacramento class
- Builders: Portsmouth Navy Yard; Boston Navy Yard; Philadelphia Navy Yard; Brooklyn Navy Yard
- Operators: Union Navy; United States Navy
- Preceded by: Ossipee-class sloop
- Succeeded by: Algoma-class sloop
- Built: 1861–1863
- In service: 1862–1883
- Planned: 6
- Completed: 6
- Lost: 2
- Retired: 4

General characteristics
- Class & type: Screw sloop
- Displacement: 2,030–2,100 long tons (2,270–2,350 short tons) or 2,526 long tons (2,829 short tons)
- Length: 225–232 feet (69–71 m)
- Beam: 38 feet (12 m)
- Draft: 16.7 feet (5.1 m)
- Installed power: 720 ihp (540 kW) or 820 ihp (610 kW)
- Propulsion: 2 × boilers; 1 × engine; 1 × propeller
- Sail plan: Barque rigged sails
- Speed: 13 knots (24 km/h; 15 mph)
- Armament: As planned: 4 × howitzers; 3 pivot guns; 1 × 50 lb (23 kg) Dahlgren gun

The Sacramento-class sloop was a series of six screw sloops operated by the United States Navy during the last half of the 19th century. The last two ships, with a slightly longer and larger design, are sometimes known as the Ticonderoga-class. The ships were built during the American Civil War to attack Confederates from the open ocean, and served various roles in supporting the Union Blockade, bombarding forts, or searching for commerce raiders. The ships were withdrawn from frontline service by the 1880s, although the last ship sank in 1908.

== Development and design ==
Following the outbreak of the American Civil War, the Union Navy was in desperate need of ships. Less than 30 warships were in service, and even less were available for combat or were under Union control. To rectify the problem, the Navy purchased civilian vessels and repurposed them for blockade duties or riverine operations. However, these vessels were poorly suited for the open ocean or bombarding enemy positions. In response, the Navy began development on a class of "fast screw steamers" for use at sea in August 1861.

The hulls were based on the Ossipee-class sloop and were intended to be armed with 3 pivot guns, a bow-mounted 50 lb (23 kg) Dahlgren gun, and four small howitzers, although the exact armament differed between each ship and the time period. Notably, the class was some of the only wooden vessels in the Navy which lacked a broadside. The specifications of the first four ship varied between 225–229 feet (69–70 m) long, but Lackawanna and Ticonderoga were 232 feet (71 m) long; for this reason, the longer duo is sometimes referred to as the Ticonderoga-class. Each ship had a beam of 38 feet (12 m) and a draft of 16.7 feet (5.1 m), although the two designs slightly deviated from one another by several inches.

The ships had one funnel and were propelled by 2 boilers and one propeller. The lengthened duo had an engine which produced 820 ihp (610 kW) compared to the rest of the class which produced 720 ihp (540 kW). Both engine types could reach 10 knots (19 km/h; 12 mph), and combined with the barque-rigged sails, speeds up to 13 knots (24 km/h; 15 mph) were achieved. Ticonderoga and her sister displaced 2,526 long tons (2,829 short tons) while the other four ships measured between 2,030–2,100 long tons (2,270–2,350 short tons).In 1864, the longer design served as the basis for the Algoma-class sloops.

== Service history ==
After entering service, the ships were spread out across various squadrons to support either the blockade, attacks on enemy forts, or to search for Confederate commerce raiders in Europe. After the war's end, the ships were assigned to new squadrons and distributed across the world. In 1869, Canandaigua was briefly renamed Detroit, although the old name was reinstated by the end of the year. The class was slowly decommissioned between the 1870s and 1880s, although Sacramento ran aground off India and was abandoned in 1867. The last ship in service was Monongahela, who had her engines removed in 1883 and operated as a store ship before she caught fire and sank at Guantanamo Bay in 1908.

== Ships in class ==
Data
Name	Builder	Laid down	Launched	Commissioned	Decommissioned
Sacramento	Portsmouth Navy Yard	1861	28 April 1862	7 January 1863	Ran aground, 19 June 1867
Canandaigua	Boston Navy Yard	December 1861	28 March 1862	1 August 1862	8 November 1875
Shenandoah	Philadelphia Navy Yard	1861	8 December 1862	20 January 1863	1882
Monongahela	Philadelphia Navy Yard	December 1861	10 July 1862	15 January 1863	Out of service 1883
Lackawanna	Brooklyn Navy Yard	1862	9 August 1862	8 January 1863	1873
Ticonderoga	Brooklyn Navy Yard	1862	16 October 1862	12 May 1863	10 September 1882
