= Ossipee-class sloop =

19th century American screw sloops

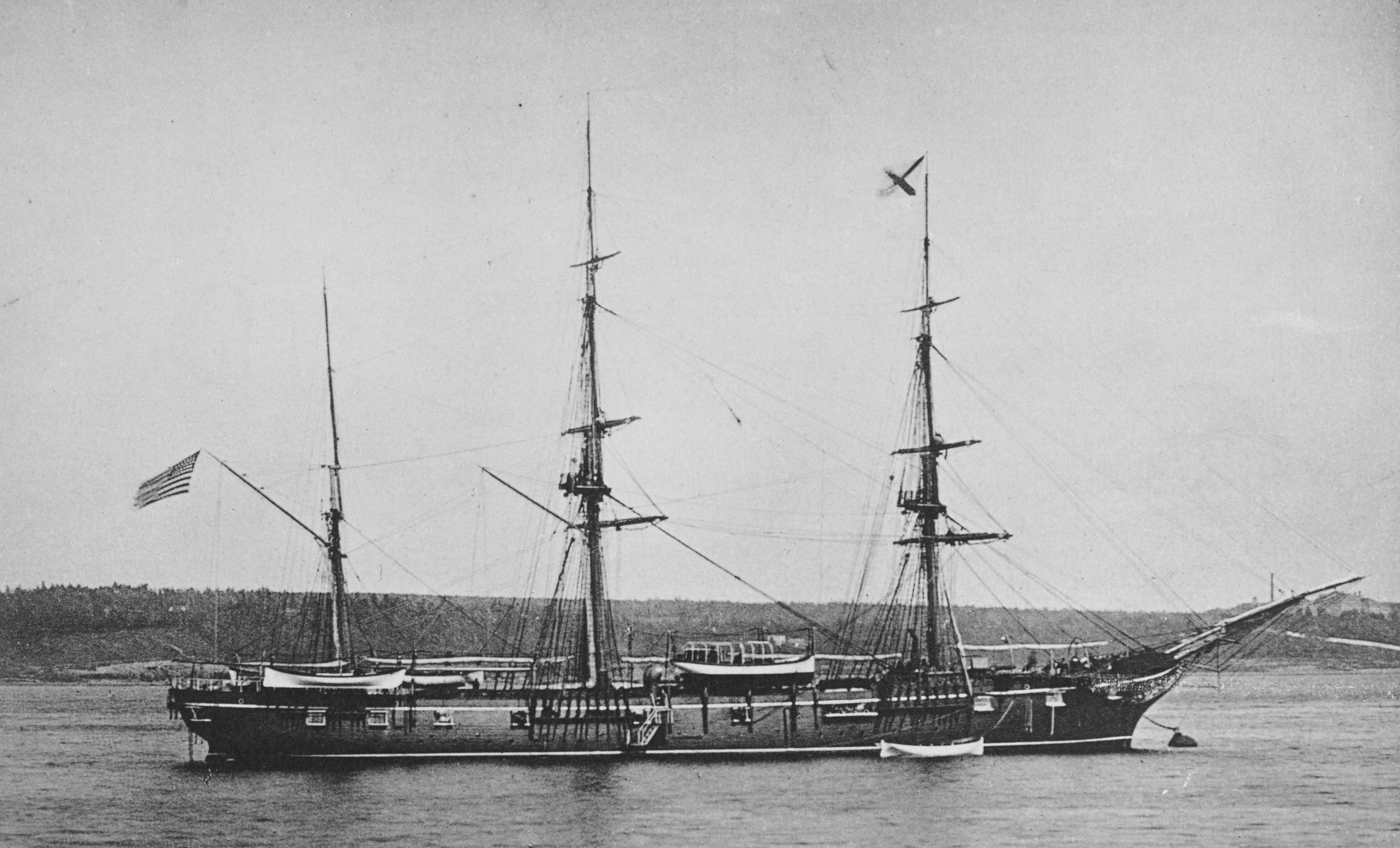
- Lead of the class USS Ossipee sometime during the 1880s.

Class overview
- Name: Ossipee class
- Builders: Brooklyn Navy Yard; Boston Navy Yard; Philadelphia Navy Yard; Portsmouth Navy Yard
- Operators: Union Navy; United States Navy
- Preceded by: Mohican-class sloop
- Succeeded by: Sacramento-class sloops
- Built: 1861–1862
- In service: 1862–1889
- Completed: 4
- Lost: 2
- Retired: 2

General characteristics
- Class & type: Screw sloop
- Displacement: 1,900 short tons (1,700 long tons)
- Length: 205 feet (62 m)
- Beam: 38 feet (12 m)
- Draft: 16.7 feet (5.1 m)
- Installed power: 700 ihp (520 kW)
- Propulsion: 2 × boilers; 1 × engine; 1 × propeller
- Sail plan: Rigged as barques
- Speed: 10 knots (19 km/h; 12 mph)
- Complement: 200
- Armament: As planned: 1 or 2 pivot guns; ~6 × 32 lb (15 kg) cannons

The Ossipee-class sloop was a series of screw sloops operated by the United States Navy during the American Civil War and later half of the 19th century. The four ships were intended to be heavily armed and operate out at sea as part of a new generation of steam warships. Ordered soon after the outbreak of war, the ships joined the Union Blockade, where two of them were sunk. The remaining duo remained in service for two more decades before they were decommissioned in 1889.

== Development and design ==
By the late 1850s, the United States Navy had begun the transition to steam-propelled warships across its fleet. However, these new vessels were generally large, had deep drafts, and were poorly suited for operations in shallow coastal waters. In 1857, the Navy filled this gap by developing several designs of new warships. These ships were intended to feature "light draft, great speed, and heavy guns." One such design was the Mohican-class sloop, which ultimately consisted of seven ships. After the Battle of Fort Sumter and the start of the American Civil War, Congress ordered four enlarged versions of the Mohican-class, intended for service on the open ocean.

The four new ships were larger than their parent designs in every way. They displaced 1,900 short tons (1,700 long tons), had a length of 205 feet (62 m), beam of 38 feet (12 m), and a draft of 16.7 feet (5.1 m). The ships carried about 235 short tons (210 long tons) of coal which fueled two boilers and a two-cylinder engine to produce 700 ihp (520 kW) and a top speed of 10 knots (19 km/h; 12 mph) through one propeller. They were rigged as barques, had a complement of 200, and were fitted with one funnel. Congress called for the ships to be equipped with the most powerful armament possible, which in practice often consisted of one or two large-caliber guns mounted on pivots and a broadside battery of about six 32 lb (15 kg) cannons. In August 1861, the same year the ships were laid down, the design was lengthened and enlarged to produce the Sacramento-class sloops, which lacked broadside weapons and were armed with three pivot guns.

== Service history ==
After entering service by 1863, the ships were assigned to the Union Blockade. Flaws in the design soon emerged, as Juniata broke down on her maiden voyage to the blockade and similar issues plagued Ossipee. The issues were due to the inexperienced and cheap construction of their engines, which forced Ossipee to require more than a year worth of repairs. Two months after entering service, Adirondack ran aground on the Bahamas and was too damaged to be recovered. In 1864, Housatonic was sunk by CSS H. L. Hunley, which made her the first ship sunk by a submarine. Following the end of the war, the surviving two ships were spread out to various squadrons and operated around the world before they were both decommissioned in 1889.

== Ships in class ==
Data
Name	Builder	Laid down	Launched	Commissioned	Out of service
Adirondack	Brooklyn Navy Yard	1861	22 February 1862	30 June 1862	Wrecked 23 August 1862
Housatonic	Boston Navy Yard	1861	20 November 1861	29 August 1862	Sunk 17 February 1864
Juniata	Philadelphia Navy Yard	June 1861	20 March 1862	4 December 1862	1889
Ossipee	Portsmouth Navy Yard	6 June 1861	16 November 1861	6 November 1862	1889
