= USS Adirondack (1862) =

Gunboat during the American Civil War that sank off the Bahamas

Coordinates: 26.6184°N 77.0240°W

History

United States
- Name: USS Adirondack
- Namesake: The Adirondack Mountains
- Builder: New York Navy Yard, Brooklyn, New York
- Laid down: 1861
- Launched: 22 February 1862
- Sponsored by: Miss Mary Paulding
- Commissioned: 30 June 1862
- Out of service: 23 August 1862
- Fate: Wrecked 23 August 1862

General characteristics
- Type: Screw sloop
- Displacement: 1,240 long tons (1,260 t)
- Length: 207 ft 1 in (63.12 m)
- Beam: 38 ft (12 m)
- Draft: 10 ft 2 in (3.10 m)
- Depth of hold: 16 ft 10 in (5.13 m)
- Propulsion: 2 × 42 in (110 cm) cylinder, 30 in (76 cm) stroke horizontal back-acting steam engines; 2 × Martin's patent boilers; 1 × 14 ft 3 in (4.34 m) screw propeller
- Sail plan: Sloop (auxiliary sials)
- Speed: 14 kn (16 mph; 26 km/h)
- Complement: 160
- Armament: 2 × 11 in (280 mm) smoothbore guns, 4 × 32-pounder smoothbore guns, 2 × 24-pounder smoothbore guns, 1 × 12-pounder smoothbore gun

The first USS Adirondack was a large and powerful screw-assisted sloop of war with heavy guns, contracted by the Union Navy early in the American Civil War. She was intended for use by the Union Navy as a warship in support of the Union Navy blockade of Confederate waterways. Her career with the Navy proved to be short, yet active and historically important. USS Adirondack was one of four sister ships of her class which included the Housatonic, Ossipee and Juniata.

== Construction and design ==
Adirondack was built at the New York Navy Yard in Brooklyn, New York. Her machinery, consisting of two 42 in (110 cm) cylinder, 30 in (76 cm) stroke horizontal back-acting steam engines and two Martin's patent boilers, powering a single 14 ft 3 in (4.34 m) screw propeller, was constructed by the Novelty Iron Works of New York City. The engines were fitted with a Sewall's tonface condenser and a distilling apparatus, capable of producing 300 US gal (1,100 L) of water in a 24-hour period.

Adirondack was laid down in 1861; launched on 22 February 1862; sponsored by Ms. Mary Paulding, a daughter of Flag Officer Hiram Paulding, the Commandant of the New York Navy Yard; named for the Adirondack Mountains, and commissioned on 30 June 1862, Commander Guert Gansevoort in command.

== Service History ==
Although Adirondack was originally slated for duty in the West Gulf Blockading Squadron, events in the Bahamas changed her fate. Before she sailed for the Gulf of Mexico, news reached Washington, D.C. that the British-built screw steamer Oreto — later known as the CSS Florida — had arrived at the island of New Providence and, although constructed under the pretext of being a merchantman destined for service under the Italian Government, was in reality a cruiser which was then being fitted out as a Confederate commerce raider. Thus, on 11 July, Secretary of the Navy Gideon Welles ordered Gansevoort to proceed in Adirondack to the West Indies to investigate the report.

=== First Bahamas Voyage ===
The new Union screw-sloop of war departed New York City on 17 July and headed for the Bahamas. Six days out, she chanced upon a schooner and, after a two-hour chase, boarded the stranger. The ship proved to be a Baltimore, Maryland-built vessel named Emma which was operating out of Nassau, Bahamas, under a British colonial register. Since the schooner's master had only recently arrived in the West Indies in command of the blockade runner Ann E. Barry, and since Emma was laden with "articles of great need in the so-called Confederate States," Gansevoort sent her to Philadelphia, Pennsylvania, under a prize crew.

Two days later, on the morning of the 25th, when in sight of Nassau but still "beyond the territorial jurisdiction of ... the British Empire," Gansevoort "discovered shortly after daylight a steamer standing in for Nassau." He again gave chase and fired upon the fleeing ship; but, this time, his quarry's speed enabled her to reach the neutral port safely. Some two hours later, a boat from the Royal Navy sloop of war HMS Greyhound pulled alongside Adirondack as she approached Nassau and delivered a letter to the American steamer protesting her role in the recent chase and informing Gansevoort that the elusive steamer was named Herald and had been "struck two or three times with shot" during the action.

Shortly thereafter, Adirondack anchored in the roadstead off Nassau harbor, and Gansevoort sent Greyhound's commanding officer a written reply to the protest, justifying his course of action. He then went ashore where he learned that Herald — commanded by "the notorious rebel Coxetter, formerly captain of the rebel privateer Jeff. Davis" — had returned from Charleston, South Carolina, laden with cotton after delivering a cargo of ammunition to that Confederate port.

Since Adirondack had encountered extremely severe weather during her passage out from New York, she remained at Nassau for three days undergoing voyage repairs and replenishing her coal bunkers.

=== Return to Southern Blockade ===
Gansevoort left Nassau to sail for Virginia Capes on 28 July. Upon arriving at Hampton Roads, Virginia, on 4 August, he reported that Oreto was indeed a Confederate cruiser, but that she was in the possession of a British prize crew, awaiting a hearing in Admiralty court. He also noted that sentiment in the Bahamas strongly favored the Confederacy, and claimed that Oreto was being outfitted for continued operations as a southern blockade runner. Thus, Gansevoort doubted that any judicial action would be taken against the warship. He was correct, and Oreto would later be freed and operate as the CSS Florida. On 12 August, Secretary of the Navy Welles ordered Adirondack to proceed to Port Royal, South Carolina, to report to Rear Admiral Samuel Francis Du Pont for duty in the South Atlantic Blockading Squadron. The next day, a report reached Washington, D.C., that another British-built cruiser – later known as the CSS Alabama – had slipped out of England and was heading for Nassau. Anxiety over this new threat prompted Welles to send Adirondack back to the Bahamas to investigate. Nevertheless, before this message reached Hampton Roads, the steamer had sailed for Port Royal in compliance with her orders of the 12th. Word of her new mission finally caught up with her there on the 18th and she got underway for Nassau that afternoon.

=== Second Bahamas Voyage and Grounding ===
While underway towards Nassau around 0400 on 23 August 1862, Adirondack struck a reef off the northeast point of Man-O-War Cay of the Little Bahama Bank group. The initial shock disabled her engine and the ship became thoroughly grounded. Throughout the day, the crew worked to lighten the ship, even throwing her massive XI-inch Dahlgren guns overboard. By 1800 that evening, the back of the ship was broken and her lower decks were flooded. The next day was spent securing as much government property as possible. On the third day after her grounding, Gansevoort heard news that Oreto had, in fact, been freed and was now underway. In response, he spike the remaining guns on board and threw them overboard. On 1 September, Gansevoort and his crew left the ship to the sea.

== See also ==
- List of sloops of war of the United States Navy
- Bibliography of early American naval history
