= Man-O-War Cay =

Island in the Abaco region of the Bahamas

- Location in Bahamas Location in North Atlantic

Geography
- Location: Atlantic Ocean
- Coordinates: 26°35′15″N 77°00′25″W
- Type: Cay
- Archipelago: Lucayan Archipelago

Administration
- Bahamas

Demographics
- Population: 215 (2010)

Additional information
- Time zone: EST (UTC-5)
  - Summer (DST): EDT (UTC-4)
- ISO code: BS-HT

Man-O-War Cay is a small island in the Abaco region of the Bahamas. As of the 2010 census, the island has a population of 215 residents.

== History ==
After the declaration of the Bahamas as a British colony in 1748, several thousand English loyalists and enslaved people were relocated to the Bahamas following the American War of Independence. The land was provided to the settlers as compensation for land lost in the USA after the defeat of Britain. The settlers built plantations across the Bahamas. The Island of Man-O-War Cay saw its first loyalist settlement in 1798, one of the earliest in The Abacos.

At the beginning of the 19th century, Benjamin Archer, a descendant of the British loyalists, owned the island. His daughter Eleanor married a descendant of the British Puritans, also known as Eleutherian Adventurers, who first settled in the Bahamas in the early 16th century. The couple became known as the town's founders and the island's boat-building industry. According to Albury family records, the town on Man-O-War Cay did not grow organically, but Eleanor meticulously planned out the town, including space for roads, a church, a school, and a cemetery. The couple had 13 children; the family is still well-represented and known on the island.

On September 1, 2019, Hurricane Dorian made landfall on Man-O-War Cay in the Abaco Islands after 16:00 UTC with winds of 185 mph (295 km/h) and wind gusts up to 225 mph (360 km/h), tying Dorian with the 1935 Labor Day hurricane as the strongest landfalling Atlantic hurricane on record. Reports of major damage throughout the islands have been described as "catastrophic damage" and "pure hell." In the days following the storm, CNN reported that 90% to 100% of all buildings on Man-O-War Cay had sustained damage.

== Geography ==
This island is about 2.5 miles (4.0 km) long, but relatively narrow, often less than 100 metres between the harbor and the beach side of the island. A section of the island called "The Narrows" by visitors and "The Low Place" by locals is exceptionally narrow, with a beach on both sides separated by a roadway built into the rock formation between them, less than 10 metres across. The harbor side of the island faces Marsh Harbour, and a beach side runs the length of the opposite shore.

Wreckage of the first USS Adirondack, which ran aground in August 1862, is strewn on the reef just northeast of Man-O-War.

== Governance ==
Man-O-War Cay is represented in Parliament by the MP (Member of Parliament) for the South Abaco constituency, James Albury.

Currently, Man-O-War's representatives on the Hope Town District Council (which also includes two neighboring Cays) are Jeremy Sweeting and Arthur Elden. Jeremy Sweeting serves as the Chief Councillor for their District.

== Economy ==
The island is notable for its boat building history. William H. Albury was renowned in the country for his boat building skills. He built his first schooner at the age of 14. Albury died in 1972, but the boat building on the Cay still lives on. The Esperanto was the last big boat built by the William H. Albury Ship Yard. The Esperanto was later renamed The William H. Albury in his honor. Today, boat building consists primarily of fiberglass boats, instead of wooden vessels.

Several workers commute each day from Marsh Harbour. There are two small grocery stores, a marina, a boat yard, a few gift shops, a hardware and lumber store, two restaurants, a bakery, and a gear shop owned and operated by a descendant of the Albury family who makes, among other things, their famous ditty bags. Golf-carts are rented by several companies (the narrow roads, often unpaved outside of the town centre, only permit the use of golf-carts or other small vehicles). No liquor is sold on the island. During the summer, some local houses are rented by vacationing families.

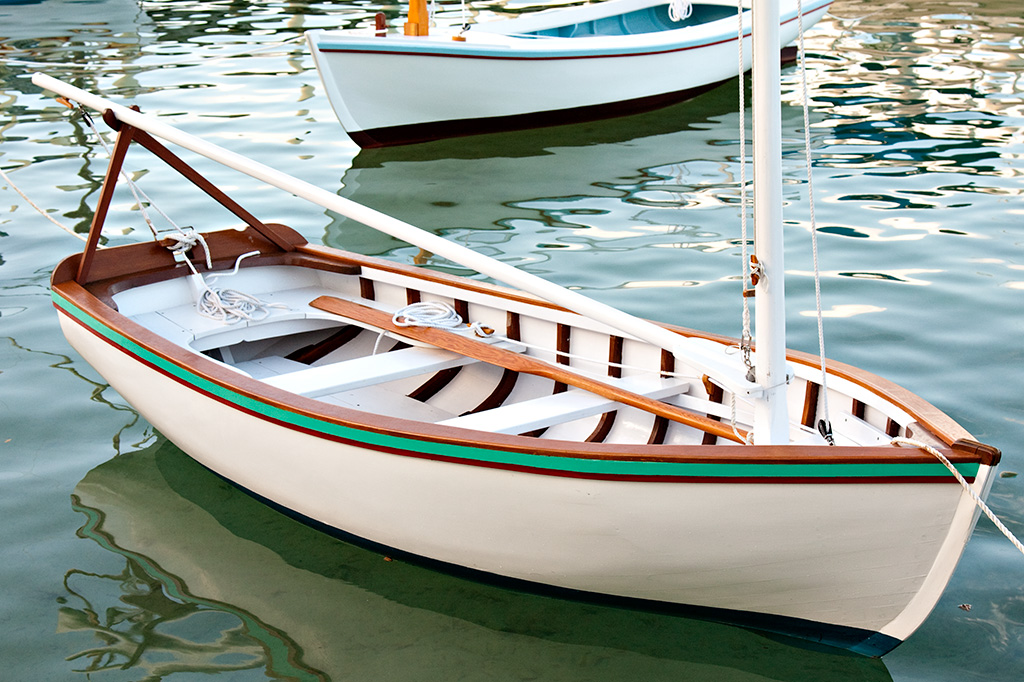
Abaco Dinghies built by Joseph Albury on Man-O-War Cay, 2010

The home builders of Man-O-War are known throughout the Bahamas for building homes that "are built like ships, but bolted to the land." All the rafters and structure are joined together like a ship and resist hurricanes very well. Several local boat builders still make the occasional "Abaco Dinghy" in their native woods of Madeira mahogany and other Bahamian hardwoods. Today, they are considered works of art and are sought after by those who appreciate fine old-world wooden vessels.

== Transport ==
Public travel to Man-O-War Cay is available via ferry from Marsh Harbour.

== Community ==
Most of the residents are related to the Albury family in some way. The people are very conservative and still hold deep affection and loyalty to the British Crown. The majority of the residents are avid church-goers. The island has four churches, one Non-denominational, one Pentecostal, one Methodist, and one Plymouth Brethren. The island has very little crime and is considered clean and well-kept.

== Sport ==
The diving, snorkeling and water sports around the island are available.
