= USS Iroquois (1859) =

War ship

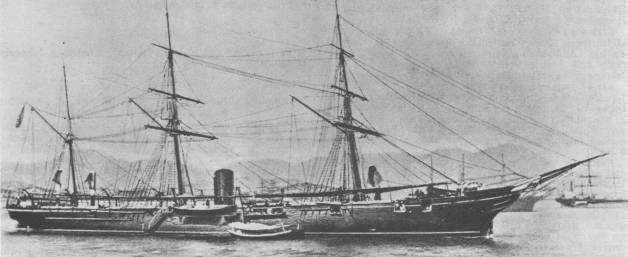
- USS Iroquois

History

United States
- Name: USS Iroquois
- Builder: New York Navy Yard, Brooklyn, New York
- Launched: 12 April 1859
- Commissioned: 24 November 1859
- Decommissioned: 6 October 1862
- Recommissioned: 8 January 1863
- Decommissioned: 8 October 1863
- Recommissioned: 13 March 1864
- Decommissioned: 6 October 1865
- Recommissioned: 7 January 1867
- Decommissioned: 23 April 1870
- Recommissioned: 23 August 1871
- Decommissioned: 23 July 1874
- Recommissioned: 12 April 1882
- Decommissioned: 12 May 1892
- Fate: Transferred to Marine Hospital Service
- Acquired: Transferred from Marine Hospital Service
- Recommissioned: 13 December 1898
- Decommissioned: 30 June 1899
- Fate: Transferred to Marine Hospital Service
- Renamed: Ionie 30 November 1904
- Stricken: 26 August 1910

General characteristics
- Type: Sloop-of-war
- Displacement: 1,016 long tons (1,032 t)
- Length: 198 ft 11 in (60.63 m)
- Beam: 33 ft 10 in (10.31 m)
- Draft: 13 ft 10 in (4.22 m)
- Propulsion: steam
- Speed: 11 knots (20 km/h; 13 mph)
- Armament: 1 × 50-pounder gun; 4 × 32-pounder guns; 1 × 12-pounder howitzer

The first USS Iroquois was a Mohican-class sloop of war in the United States Navy during the American Civil War.

== Construction and commissioning ==
Iroquois was launched by the New York Navy Yard on 12 April 1859 and commissioned 24 November 1859, Commander James S. Palmer in command.

== Service history ==
=== Mediterranean, 1860–1861 ===
Iroquois got underway from New York on 19 January 1860 for duty in the Mediterranean. Her service came at a time of political unrest in Europe, with the movement for Italian unification in its beginning stages. Iroquois sailed for Palermo, Sicily, to protect American lives and property as Giuseppe Garibaldi began his campaign to capture the island for Piedmont-Sardinia. The Italian patriot came on board Iroquois on 20 June 1860 and conferred with Commander Palmer. The ship operated in the Mediterranean into 1861, but the impending Civil War brought greater demands on the Navy and she was recalled.

=== Caribbean, 1861–1862 ===
Arriving 15 June 1861 at New York, she was immediately sent to the Caribbean to seek and destroy Southern commerce raiders. At Martinique she found CSS Sumter anchored in the harbor. But the Confederate ship, under command of Raphael Semmes, with the assistance of French authorities slipped out on 23 November to resume attacks on Union shipping. Iroquois continued her patrol in the Caribbean. On 14 January 1862 she stopped British sloop Rinaldo. On board were Confederate ministers James M. Mason and John Slidell, captured earlier by Union ships but released; Comdr. Palmer allowed them to proceed under surveillance.

=== Mississippi River Squadron, 1862 ===
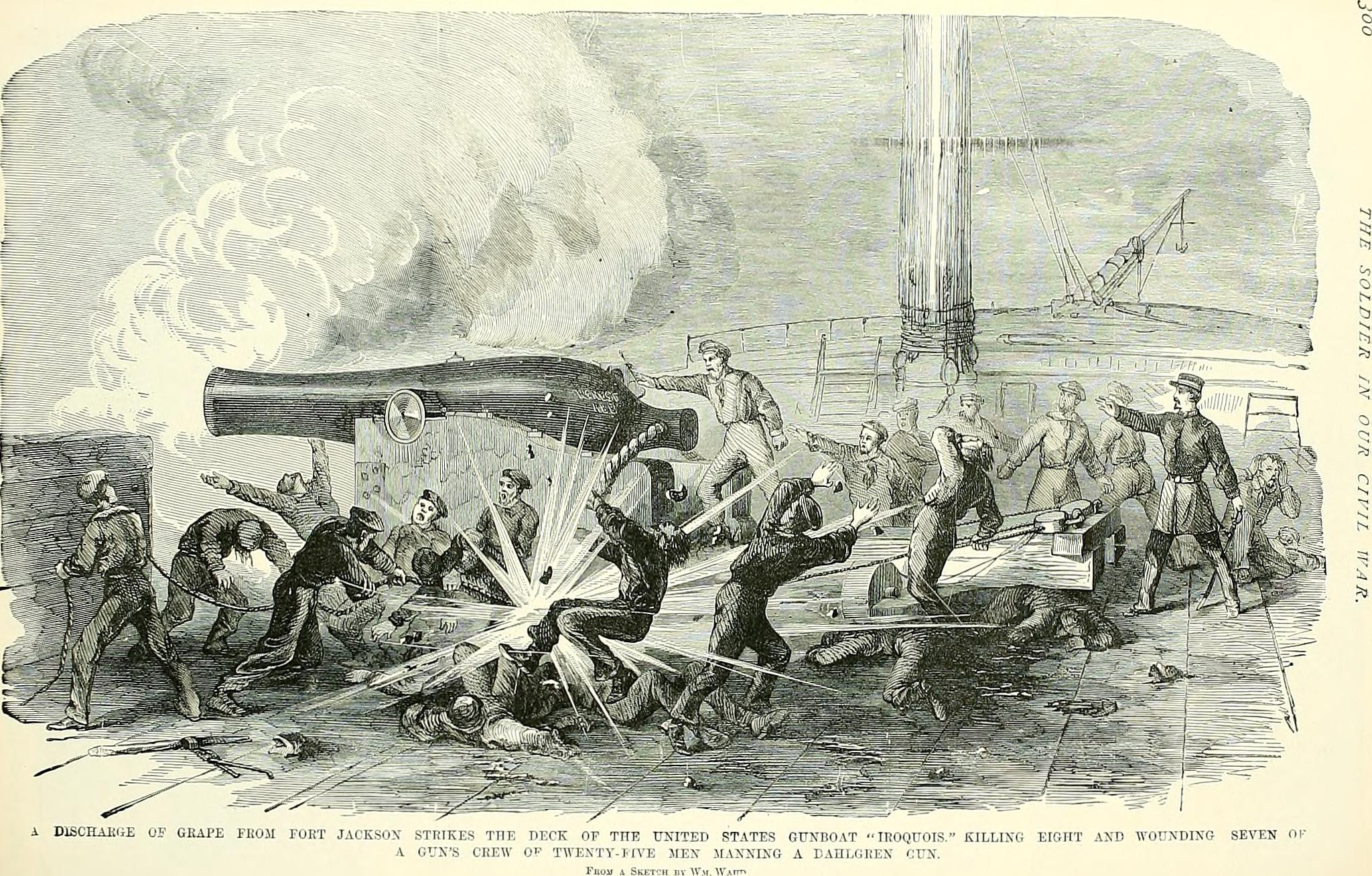
Struck by a discharge of grape from Fort Jackson

Iroquois was sent later in 1862 to join Flag Officer David Farragut at the mouth of the Mississippi River, in preparation for his attack on New Orleans, Louisiana. Arriving off Ship Island 28 March, the ship moved to a position below Forts Jackson and St. Philip, guarding New Orleans, 16 April. Comdr. David Dixon Porter's mortar boats then began a devastating bombardment, and by 24 April the ships were ready to attack. Iroquois moved abreast the forts as part of the 3rd Division under Captain Henry H. Bell and, after a spirited engagement, passed them and pressed on for the capture of New Orleans, the South's largest and wealthiest city, and key to the Mississippi Valley.

After the great victory Iroquois advanced up the river with Farragut, with the aim of eventually joining Flag Officer Andrew Hull Foote, who was driving southward. A landing party was sent ashore at Baton Rouge, Louisiana 8 May 1862 and Comdr. Palmer received the surrender of the Louisiana capital that day. Iroquois, along with Oneida, also took possession of Natchez on 13 May as the fleet moved steadily toward the Southern stronghold at Vicksburg, Mississippi. Within a week they were below the city and preparing to pass the formidable batteries.

After periodic shelling Flag Officer Farragut, supported by the mortar boats, passed the Vicksburg batteries on 28 June after a heavy exchange of gunfire. Iroquois survived the action virtually unscathed. With the rest of the fleet, she met Flag Officer Charles Davis and his Western Flotilla above Vicksburg. This was but the first step of Abraham Lincoln's order to "clear the river." Iroquois remained in the Vicksburg area until late July, helping in the bombardments and preparations for expeditions into the surrounding marshlands. In early September she again entered the Gulf of Mexico to take part in the strangling blockade of Southern commerce, but boiler trouble sent her north on 21 September. She arrived at New York on 2 October and was decommissioned on 6 October 1862 for repairs.

=== North Atlantic Blockading Squadron, 1863 ===
Iroquois recommissioned on 8 January 1863, Comdr. Henry Roland in command, and got underway later that month to convoy monitor Weehawken to Newport News, Virginia. Joining the North Atlantic Blockading Squadron off North Carolina, she captured blockade runner Merrimac 24 July and helped in the capture of Kate 12 days earlier. After several more months on arduous blockade, she steamed to Baltimore, Maryland for repairs, decommissioning 8 October 1863.

See also: Blockade runners of the American Civil War

=== Mediterranean & Pacific, 1864–1865 ===
The ship recommissioned 31 March 1864, Comdr. Christopher R. P. Rodgers in command. After serving briefly in the North Atlantic, Iroquois steamed to the Mediterranean to protect American commerce and interests. She also took part in the giant search for the Confederate raider Shenandoah, finally arriving Singapore in May 1865 after a long voyage around South America and across the Pacific. With the war over, she sailed in July for the United States, arriving New York on 1 October 1865. She decommissioned there 6 October 1865.

=== Asiatic Squadron, 1867–1874 ===
Upon recommissioning on 7 January 1867, Comdr. Earl English in command, the veteran ship sailed 3 February for duty with the Asiatic Squadron. She was present at Osaka, Japan, when that port and neighboring Hyōgo were opened to foreign commerce 1 January 1868; and she took part in the rescue operations following the overturning of Rear Admiral Henry H. Bell's boat in the harbor 11 January. Despite the best efforts of the ships present, the squadron commander and 11 others were drowned. During the local conflicts which engulfed the ports during January, Iroquois stood by to protect American interests, and carried the foreign ministers to Hyōgo 1 February when they were expelled from Osaka. She remained on this critical duty until returning to the United States in February 1870. She was decommissioned at League Island, Pennsylvania, 23 April 1870.

Iroquois was recommissioned on 23 August 1871 under Commander H. A. Adams. While in the Delaware River on 7 September of that year, Ordinary Seaman Hugh King jumped overboard and rescued a shipmate from drowning, for which he was awarded the Medal of Honor. Iroquois operated on the East Coast until 18 March 1872. She then sailed for another cruise with the Asiatic Fleet, making the long voyage via the Mediterranean, the Suez Canal, and the Indian Ocean. The ship remained off China and Japan until returning to San Francisco, California on 1 July 1874. She was again decommissioned for repairs on 23 July 1874.

=== Pacific Squadron, 1882–1892 ===
Following a long period of inactivity, Iroquois recommissioned on 12 April 1882, Comdr. James H. Sands in command. With the Pacific Squadron, she patrolled to South America, Hawaii, Australia, and Pacific islands protecting American interests and commerce. She took part in naval action in Panama in the spring of 1885, helping to land Marines to protect American commerce during the revolution.

In 1889, the Iroquois was sent to Samoa, to reinforce American forces in the aftermath of the 1889 Apia cyclone. Her engines broke down after leaving Honolulu and she spent the next eighty-two days being blown around the Pacific before washing up in Port Townsend, Washington. After repairs at Mare Island, during which forty of her crew deserted, she again set out for Samoa. Future Marine Corps commandants George Barnett and Ben Fuller served on her during this episode. Returning from Samoa, Iroquois arrived Mare Island on 24 April 1892 and decommissioned there 12 May 1892.

=== Marine Hospital Service, 1892–1910 ===
The ship was transferred to the Marine Hospital Service at Naval Base Hawaii and served until she recommissioned 13 December 1898, Lt. Charles F. Pond in command. She cruised in the Pacific for six months before decommissioning at Honolulu, Hawaii 30 June 1899. Iroquois was then transferred again to the Marine Hospital Service. Her name was changed to Ionie 30 November 1904. Her name was struck from the Navy List on 26 August 1910.

== See also ==
- List of sloops of war of the United States Navy
