= James Benson (Medal of Honor) =

- Born: c. 1845; Denmark
- Died: August 4, 1890 (aged 44–45); Boston Harbor, Massachusetts, U.S.
- Burial place: Woodlawn Cemetery, Everett, Massachusetts
- Military career
- Allegiance: United States
- Branch: United States Navy
- Rank: Seaman
- Unit: USS Ossipee
- Awards: Medal of Honor

James Benson (c. 1845 – August 4, 1890) was a United States Navy sailor and a recipient of the United States military's highest decoration, the Medal of Honor.

== Biography ==
A native of Denmark, Benson joined the U.S. Navy from Yokohama, Japan. By June 20, 1872, he was serving as a seaman on the USS Ossipee. On that day, he jumped overboard and attempted to rescue Landsman John K. Smith from drowning. For this action, he was awarded the Medal of Honor four months later, on October 10.

Benson's official Medal of Honor citation reads:

On board the U.S.S. Ossipee, 20 June 1872. Risking his life, Benson leaped into the sea while the ship was going at a speed of 4 knots and endeavored to save John K. Smith, landsman, of the same vessel, from drowning.

Benson left the Navy while still a seaman. He died on August 4, 1890, at age 44 or 45 and was buried at Woodlawn Cemetery in Everett, Massachusetts.

== See also ==
- List of Medal of Honor recipients in non-combat incidents
