= Man-O-War Cay Boat Building =

Coordinates: 26°35′15″N 77°00′25″W

Boat building on Man-O-War Cay in Bahamas dates back to the 1880s. During the middle of the last century, numerous boat yards lined the harbor.

William H. Albury (“Uncle Will”) built some of the largest boat yards in Man-O-Way Cay. When a big boat was under construction, he might employ 15 or 20 men to work on her. Many of these men also had small yards where they built smaller boats – "Abaco Dinghies" which became the backbone of the fishing and commercial industry of the Bahamas.

In 1960, Edwin Albury started Edwin's Boat Yard. He, Keith Albury and Darvin Sands built boats of varying sizes during the 60s and were joined by Blake Albury in 1969. Edwin Albury expanded in 1976 when he bought out William H. Albury.

Joe Albury now builds Abaco Dinghies in his yard. And Willard's sons, Don and Jamie, of Albury Brothers Boats build modern center-console and runabout boats in their facility next to the water.

This page is intended to archive the names of the boat builders and boats built on Man-O-War Cay from the 1800s into the late 1900s.

Boats built on Man-O-War Cay in the 1900s

Boat name	Length (LOD)	Date Launched	Boat Yard	Additional information
White Sound	65–75 ft.		Basil Sands	Built for Herman Ahrens who lived on MOW for some years. It was a freighter type power boat used to haul freight from Florida and as in private yacht etc.
Yum Yum	40–50 ft.		Basil Sands	Sailboat built for Herman Ahrens.
Teepee (re Double Eagle)	85 ft.	1947	Delbert Albury	2-masted Schooner, 110' LOA, 33' Beam, 15' Draft, 75' Main Mast
Spinner		1956	Edwin's Boat Yard	
Malolo	40 ft.	1965	Edwin's Boat Yard	Ketch, 13' Beam, 4'6" Draft, 20 ton Disp.
Barbara W.	40 ft.	1965	Edwin's Boat Yard	
Abaco I			Edwin's Boat Yard	
Wynne I	30 ft.	Between 1918 and 1935	William H Albury Ship Yard	
Wynne II	30 ft.	Between 1918 and 1935	William H Albury Ship Yard	
Man O'War	60 ft.	Between 1935 and 1947	William H Albury Ship Yard	
Joyce Roberts	85 ft.	Between 1935 and 1947	William H Albury Ship Yard	
Donald Roberts	60 ft.	Between 1935 and 1947	William H Albury Ship Yard	Used as a tug boat for the Bahamas Cuban co. Logging operation at Cornwall II and Cross Harbour. Captained by Milton Albury of Man-o-war cay.
Sweet Heart	48 ft.	Between 1935 and 1947	William H Albury Ship Yard	
Langasta	47 ft.	Between 1935 and 1947	William H Albury Ship Yard	
Barge	130 ft.	Between 1935 and 1947	William H Albury Ship Yard	
Lucaya	50 ft.	Between 1935 and 1947	William H Albury Ship Yard	
Abaco Queen	35 ft.	Between 1935 and 1947	William H Albury Ship Yard	
Several unnamed hulls	35 ft.	Between 1935 and 1947	William H Albury Ship Yard	
Mary Eleanor	35 ft.	Between 1935 and 1947	William H Albury Ship Yard	
Obeah	30 ft.	Between 1935 and 1947	William H Albury Ship Yard	
Frigate Bird I	30 ft.	Between 1935 and 1947	William H Albury Ship Yard	
Frigate Bird II	42 ft.	Between 1935 and 1947	William H Albury Ship Yard	
Boat for Leach	42 ft.	Between 1935 and 1947	William H Albury Ship Yard	
Safari (now Tribute)	40 ft.	1948	William H Albury Ship Yard	Ketch, 48' LOA
Lugger	35 ft.	1951	William H Albury Ship Yard	
McCoy	35 ft.	1952	William H Albury Ship Yard	
Bagatelle	35 ft.	1955	William H Albury Ship Yard	
Romarie (re Jaunty Jess, now Flying Circus)	45 ft.	1956	William H Albury Ship Yard	61' LOA, 45' LOD, 14' Beam, 5' Draft
Challenge B. (now Tamar II)	35 ft.	1957	William H Albury Ship Yard	
Arawak	31 ft.	1959	William H Albury Ship Yard	
Dolphin	30 ft.	1963	William H Albury Ship Yard	
Esperanto (now William H Albury)	56 ft.	1963	William H Albury Ship Yard	2-masted schooner, 70' LOA, 25 ton Disp. Designed by Fred Whittier
Baracuda	41 ft.	1964	William H Albury Ship Yard	
Chubbins	44 ft.	1967	William H Albury Ship Yard	
Frigata		1960s	William H Albury Ship Yard	
Sea Fever	29 ft.	1969	William H Albury Ship Yard	
Rough Waters	30 ft.	1975	William H Albury Ship Yard	LOA is same as LOD
Abaco Rage		1980		

Man-O-War Cay Boat Builders during the 1800s

Edwin Albury	Richard ‘Uncle Dick’ Albury	Benjamin Thompson
Henry Albury	Thomas Albury	Napoleon Thompson
Jeremiah Albury	William Albury	William "Billy Bo" Thompson
Joe Albury	Winer Albury	

Man-O-War Cay Boat Builders during the 1900s

Name	Boat Yard	Role
Alma Albury	Maurice Albury	
Benny Albury	Albury Brothers Boats, also Maurice Albury	Founder
Blake Albury	Edwin's Boat Yard	Partner
Cyril Albury	William H Albury Ship Yard	
Dalbert Albury	Dalbert Albury	his yard
Dalphone Albury	Dalphone Albury	his yard
Eddie Albury Jr.	William H Albury Ship Yard	
Captain Eddie Albury Sr.	Captain Eddie Albury Sr.	his yard
Don Albury	Albury Brothers Boats	
Edwin S. Albury	Edwin's Boat Yard	Founder
Emanuel "Manny" Albury	Emanuel "Manny" Albury	his yard
Emerson Albury	Emerson Albury	his yard
Floyd Albury	Dalphone Albury	
George Albury	Emerson Albury	
Glenn Albury	Albury Brothers Boats	
Harold Albury	Harold Albury	his yard
Hartley Albury	Lewis Albury	
Haziel Albury	William H Albury Ship Yard	
Jamie Albury	Albury Brothers Boats	
Joe U. Albury	Lewis Albury, also his yard	
Keith Albury	Edwin's Boat Yard	Partner
Lewis Albury	Lewis Albury	his yard
Marcel Albury	Edwin's Boat Yard	
Maurice Albury	Maurice Albury	his yard
Mauricio Albury	Albury Brothers Boats	
Nelson Albury	William H Albury Ship Yard	
Norman Albury	Norman Albury	his yard
Paul Albury	Albury Brothers Boats	
Redith Albury	William H Albury Ship Yard	
Richard Albury	William H Albury Ship Yard	
Richie Albury	Richie Albury (with Edwin Albury)	his yard
Roland Albury	Lewis Albury	
Samuel "Sammie" Albury	Samuel "Sammie" Albury	his yard
Victor Albury	Captain Eddie Albury Sr.	
Walter Albury	Maurice Albury	
Warren Albury	Maurice Albury	
Willard Albury	Albury Brothers Boats, also Maurice Albury	Founder
William H. Albury	William H Albury Ship Yard, also Maurice Albury	Founder
Wilton Albury	William H Albury Ship Yard	
Henry Fisher	Dalbert Albury	
Derek Lee	William H Albury Ship Yard	
Basil Sands	Basil Sands	his yard
Charles Sands	Charles Sands	his yard
Darvin Sands	Edwin's Boat Yard	Partner
Harry Sands	Treason Sands	
Lavern Sands	Treason Sands	
Robbie Sands	William H Albury Ship Yard	
Treason Sands	Treason Sands	his yard
Wilson Sands	Wilson Sands	his yard
Junior Sweeting	William H Albury Ship Yard	
Pat Sweeting	William H Albury Ship Yard	
Roger Sweeting	William H Albury Ship Yard	
Tweedie Sweeting	William H Albury Ship Yard	
Kenneth Thompson	Kenneth Thompson	his yard
Lanard Thompson	Thompsons (with Percy Thompson)	his yard
Percy Thompson	Thompsons (with Lanard Thompson)	his yard
Scott Weatherford	William H Albury Ship Yard	
Stanley Weatherford	William H Albury Ship Yard	

Man-O-War Cay Boatbuilding slide show video
The following table is an index of the video, Boatbuilding on Abaco Thesis Collection (M.A.). The video was made by Sister Patricia Ann Finnerty in 1973.

Time (into the video)	Topic
0:00	Introduction to the Bahama Islands
1:06	Introduction to Man-O-War Cay - The boats in the harbour are almost all fiberglass now. The shoreline is a bit more built up. Golf carts now ply the narrow streets. Otherwise much is the same.
9:35	Mr. Basil Sands
10:00	Mr. Maurice Albury
12:27	Mr. James Jenkins Roberts (of Hope Town)
15:33	Mr. William H Albury
17:35	Mr. Clarence Sands, Mr. Norman Albury
18:10	Mr. Basil Sands
19:32	Mr. Maurice Albury
19:48	Mr. Charles Sands
20:10	Mr. Norman Albury and his Sail Loft
23:09	Abaco Dinghy
24:10	Abaco Fishing "Ketch"
24:43	Sponge Schooner
27:15	Woods used in boat building
28:03	Abaco Dinghy Construction (w/ Mr. Maurice Albury, Charles Sands & Willard Albury)
50:53	Charles Sands completed dinghy
51:07	Basil Sands completed 21 1/2' deep-well boat
52:32	Maurice Albury completed Abaco Sailing Dinghy
55:33	Leaving MOW
56:11	The End
