= John Osborne (Medal of Honor) =

United States Navy sailor

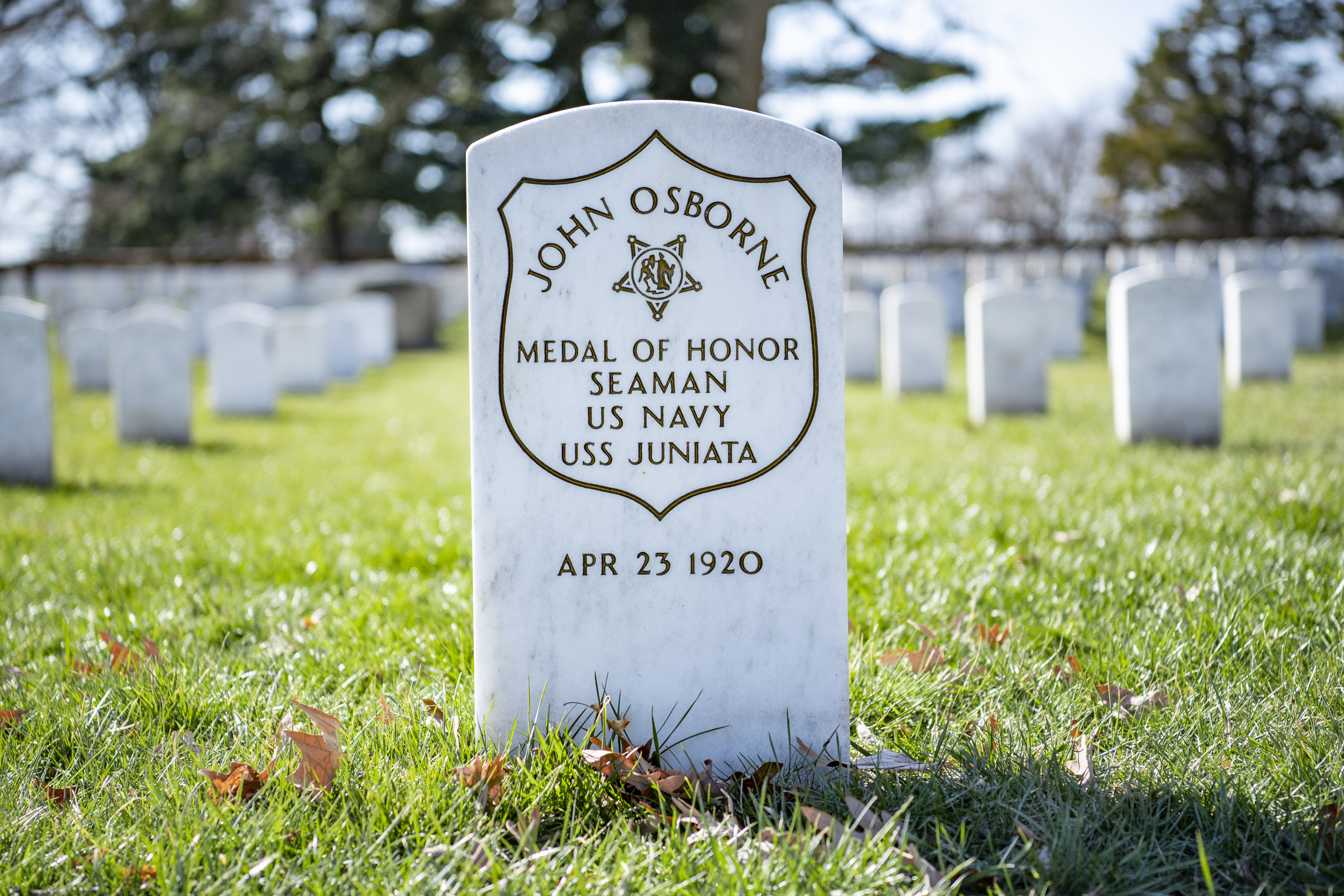
- Grave at Arlington National Cemetery
- Born: c. 1844; New Orleans, Louisiana, US
- Died: April 23, 1920 (aged 75–76)
- Burial place: Arlington National Cemetery
- Military career
- Allegiance: United States
- Branch: United States Navy
- Rank: Seaman
- Unit: USS Juniata
- Awards: Medal of Honor

John Osborne (c. 1844 – April 23, 1920) was a United States Navy sailor and a recipient of the United States military's highest decoration, the Medal of Honor.

== Biography ==
Born in 1844 in New Orleans, Louisiana, Osborne joined the Navy from that state. By August 21, 1876, he was serving as a seaman on the USS Juniata. On that day, while Juniata was at Philadelphia, Pennsylvania, he rescued shipmate 2nd Class Boy Jesse Lippey from drowning. For this action, he was awarded the Medal of Honor three days later, on August 24.

Osborne's official Medal of Honor citation reads:

Serving on board the U.S.S. Juniata, Osborne displayed gallant conduct in rescuing from drowning an enlisted boy of that vessel, at Philadelphia, Pa., 21 August 1876.

Osborne left the Navy while still holding the rank of seaman. He died on April 23, 1920, aged 75 or 76, and was buried at Arlington National Cemetery in Arlington County, Virginia.

== See also ==
- List of Medal of Honor recipients during peacetime
