= Mohican-class sloop =

19th century American screw sloops

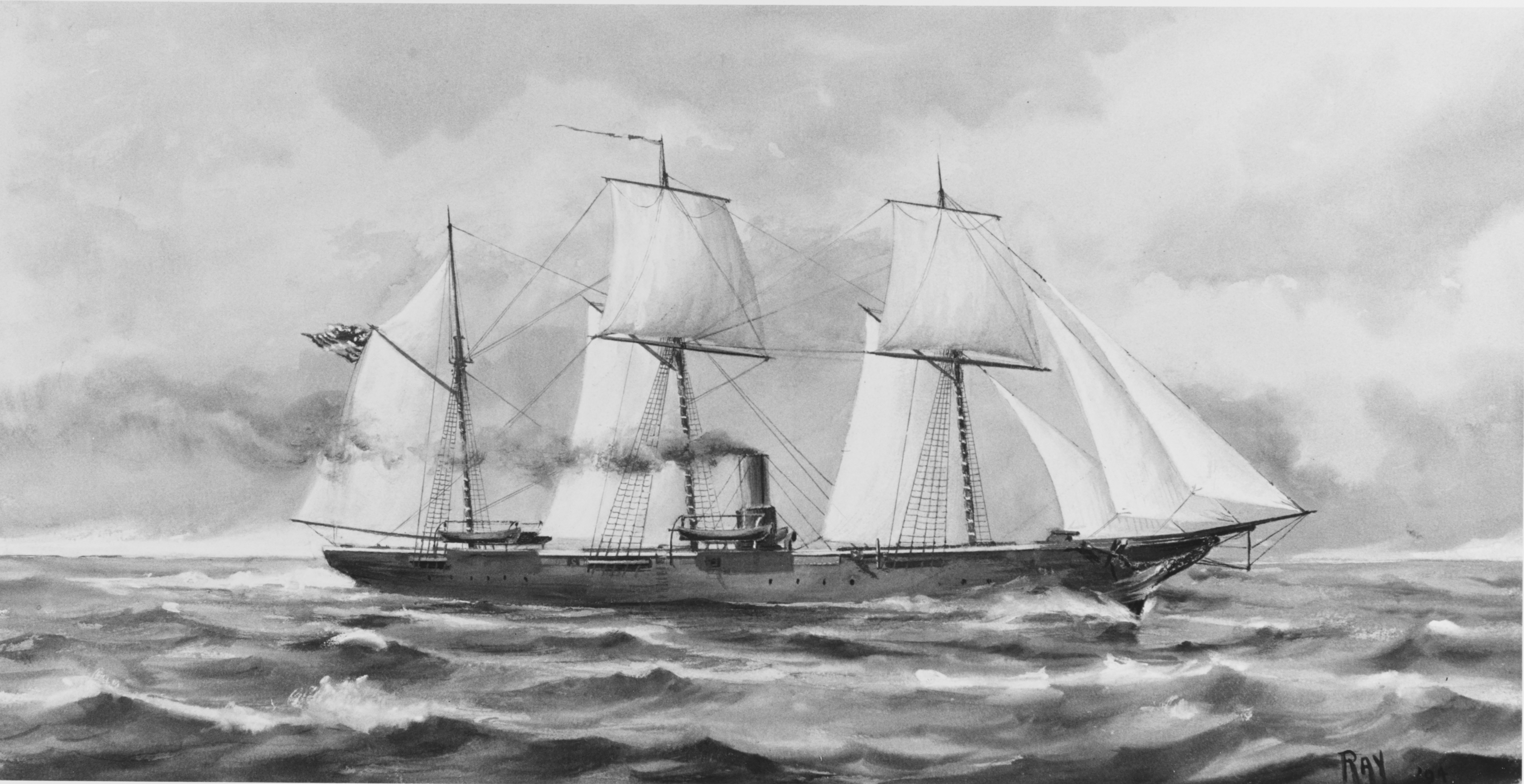
- Drawing of Kearsarge as she appeared during the Civil War, underway with sail and steam power

Class overview
- Name: Mohican class
- Builders: Philadelphia Navy Yard; Portsmouth Navy Yard; Brooklyn Navy Yard; Boston Navy Yard
- Operators: Union Navy; United States Navy
- Succeeded by: Ossipee-class sloop
- Built: 1858–1861
- In service: 1859–1892
- Planned: 7
- Completed: 7
- Lost: 1
- Retired: 6

General characteristics
- Class & type: Screw sloop
- Displacement: 1,457–1,488 long tons (1,632–1,667 short tons)
- Length: 199 feet (61 m) lbp
- Beam: 33 feet (10 m)
- Draft: 15.5 feet (4.7 m)
- Installed power: 840 ihp (630 kW)
- Propulsion: 2 × boilers; 1 × engine; 1 × propeller
- Speed: 12 knots (22 km/h; 14 mph)
- Armament: As planned: Several Dahlgren guns; 6 × 32 lb (15 kg) cannons

The Mohican-class sloop was a series of screw sloops operated by the United States Navy during the American Civil War and last half of the 19th century. The ships were designed as part of a larger push to develop steam-powered ships with a light draft for coastal missions. During the war, the class supported various Union operations, most notably the destruction of two Confederate commerce raiders. In peacetime, the ships protected American interests and were all decommissioned by the 20th century.

== Development and design ==
By the late 1850s, the United States Navy had begun the transition to steam-propelled warships across its fleet. However, these new vessels were generally large, had deep drafts, and were poorly suited for operations in shallow coastal waters. To address this gap, the Navy initiated the development of a new class of shallow-draft steam vessels in 1857. These ships were intended to feature "light draft, great speed, and heavy guns." The project received strong support from Southern congressmen, who were concerned about the possibility of the Royal Navy intercepting American ships during the enforcement of the Blockade of Africa against the Atlantic slave trade. In 1858, Congress authorized the construction of eight such vessels. One was built as a paddle steamer, while the remaining seven were ordered as screw sloops. Of these, three had a draft of 10 ft (3.0 m), and the other four had a draft of 13 ft (4.0 m).

Three of the 13 ft (4.0 m)-draft vessels–Mohican, Iroquois, and Wyoming–shared a similar design. In February 1861, Congress authorized an expansion of the class. The design of Iroquois was replicated in Oneida and Wachusett; Tuscarora was based on Wyoming; and Kearsarge was intended as a near-copy of Mohican. Although the exact armament varied by ship and time period, each was designed to carry several large-caliber Dahlgren guns mounted on pivots, along with a broadside battery of six 32 lb (15 kg) cannons.All seven ships were nearly identical in size, differing by only a few inches. They measured approximately 199 feet (61 m) long between perpendiculars, with a beam of 33 feet (10 m) and a mean draft of 15.5 feet (4.7 m). Each vessel carried 165 long tons (185 short tons) of coal to supply two boilers, which generated 840 ihp (630 kW) and powered a single screw propeller, which produced a top speed of approximately 12 knots (22 km/h; 14 mph). Their initial displacement ranged from 1,457 long tons (1,632 short tons) to 1,488 long tons (1,667 short tons). Days after the American Civil War began, Congress ordered four more enlarged sloops based on the Mohican-class design. The resulting four ships of the Ossipee-class were larger in every aspect compared to their parents, even though they were intended to carry a similar armament.

== Service history ==
All ships in the class entered service either shortly before or early in the American Civil War. At the outbreak of hostilities, they were assigned to various Union Navy squadrons, where they supported operations such as searching for Confederate commerce raiders, bombarding forts, and enforcing the Union blockade. One of the most notable engagements involving the class was the sinking of CSS Alabama by Kearsarge off the coast of France in 1864, aided in part by Kearsarge's Dahlgren guns. In a similar action that year, Wachusett rammed and captured CSS Florida off the coast of Brazil. All seven ships survived the war and were subsequently deployed to various regions around the globe to protect American interests in regions such as Hawaii and Brazil. The only loss occurred in 1870 when Oneida was struck by a British steamship and sank off the coast of Japan. Over the following two decades, the vessels were gradually decommissioned and sold. The last in Navy service, Wyoming, was used as a training vessel at the United States Naval Academy until her final withdrawal from service in 1892.

== Ships in class ==
Data
Name	Builder	Laid down	Launched	Commissioned	Decommissioned
Wyoming	Philadelphia Navy Yard	Jul 1858	19 Jan 1859	Oct 1859	1892
Mohican	Portsmouth Navy Yard	Aug 1858	15 Feb 1859	29 Nov 1859	25 June 1872
Iroquois	Brooklyn Navy Yard	Aug 1858	12 Apr 1859	24 Nov 1859	1892
Tuscarora	Philadelphia Navy Yard	27 Jun 1861	24 Aug 1861	5 Dec 1861	31 May 1880
Kearsarge	Portsmouth Navy Yard	May 1861	5 Oct 1861	24 Jan 1862	1882
Oneida	Brooklyn Navy Yard	Jun 1861	20 Nov 1861	28 Feb 1862	Sank, 24 January 1870
Wachusett	Boston Navy Yard	Jun 1861	10 Oct 1861	3 Mar 1862	1885
