= USS Granite =

Gunboat of the United States Navy

History

United States
- Name: Granite
- Namesake: Granite
- Acquired: 19 January 1862
- In service: 19 January 1862
- Out of service: 29 June 1865
- Stricken: 1865 (est.)
- Fate: Returned to the Lighthouse Board

General characteristics
- Type: Sloop
- Displacement: 75 tons
- Propulsion: sail
- Speed: varied
- Complement: 13
- Armament: one 32-pounder/57 gun; one 30-pounder gun

The USS Granite was a sloop acquired by the Union Navy during the American Civil War. She was used by the Navy to patrol navigable waterways of the Confederacy to prevent the South from trading with other countries.

== Acquired from the Lighthouse Board ==
Granite, wooden sailing sloop, was transferred from Lighthouse Board 19 January 1862, and assigned in North Atlantic Blockading Squadron to Sound of North Carolina in Goldsborough's Expedition to Roanoke Island, Acting Master's Mate Ephraim Boomer in command.

== Capture of Roanoke Island, North Carolina ==
She participated in the capture of Confederate works on Roanoke Island, North Carolina, 7–8 February 1862. For the remainder of the Civil War, she operated in the sounds of North Carolina.

== Decommissioning and return to the Lighthouse Board ==
Granite decommissioned at Washington 29 June 1865 and was returned to the Lighthouse Board.
