= USS Sacramento (1862) =

US Navy sloop (1862–1867)

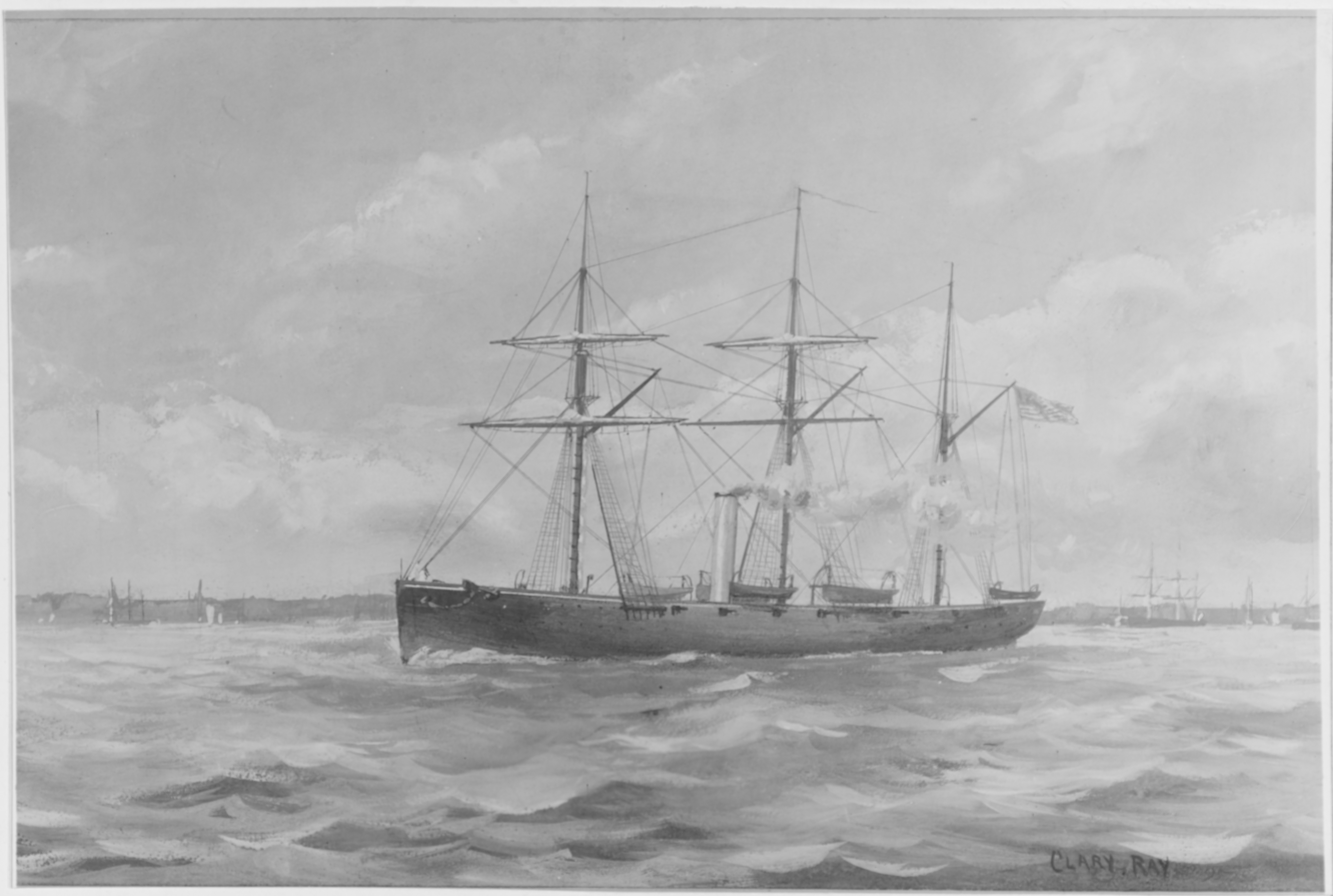
- Wash drawing of Sacramento as she appeared during the American Civil War

History

United States
- Name: USS Sacramento
- Builder: Portsmouth Navy Yard, Kittery, Maine
- Launched: 28 April 1862
- Commissioned: 7 January 1863
- Decommissioned: 21 August 1865
- Recommissioned: 17 September 1866
- Fate: Grounded and wrecked, 19 June 1867

General characteristics
- Type: Screw sloop-of-war
- Displacement: 2,100 long tons (2,100 t)
- Length: 229 ft 6 in (69.95 m)
- Beam: 38 ft (12 m)
- Draft: 8 ft 10 in (2.69 m)
- Depth of hold: 16 ft 7 in (5.05 m)
- Propulsion: Steam engine
- Speed: 12.5 kn (14.4 mph; 23.2 km/h)
- Complement: 161 officers and enlisted
- Armament: 1 × 150-pounder rifle, 2 × 11 in (280 mm) smoothbore guns, 1 × 30-pounder rifle, 2 × 24-pounder howitzers, 2 × 12-pounder rifles, 2 × 12-pounder smoothbore guns

The first USS Sacramento was a sloop-of-war in the United States Navy.

Sacramento was launched on 28 April 1862 at the Portsmouth Navy Yard, in Kittery, Maine; sponsored by a Mrs. Tilton of Boston; and commissioned on 7 January 1863, Commander Andrew E. K. Benham in command.

== Civil War, 1863-1865 ==
Sacramento's first assignment was blockade duty off the North Carolina coast as part of the effort to eliminate Confederate shipping operations at Wilmington. During her cruising off the Western Bar at Wilmington on 1 May 1863, she captured the British blockade runner Wanderer. Ordered to European waters after refitting, Sacramento departed Boston on 2 February 1864, calling at the Azores, Cape Town, and the Canary Islands before arriving at Cherbourg, France on 5 July. Subsequently, she cruised off the British and French coasts in the search for Confederate vessels engaged in both commerce raiding and blockade running operations. On 16 August, she collided with and sank the Norwegian brig Ceres in the English Channel 9 nautical miles (17 km) south south west of Plymouth, Devon. Sacramento rescued her crew. She collided with, and severely damaged, the Swedish schooner Victor on 22 August and subsequently put in to Vlissingen, Zeeland, Netherlands. Sacramento assisted in blockading the Confederate gun vessel CSS Rappahannock detained at Calais, France, in early 1865, and in March joined USS Niagara off Ferrol, Spain, to observe the movements of the formidable Confederate casemate turret ram Stonewall bound for Cuba from Bordeaux, France. Departing Queenstown, Ireland on 25 July, after the conclusion of hostilities in home waters, Sacramento arrived at Boston on 12 August. Decommissioned on 21 August at the Boston Navy Yard, she remained inactive into 1866.

== Voyage to East Asia, 1866-1867 ==
Recommissioned on 17 September 1866, Sacramento was assigned to special service in Chinese and Japanese waters. Outward bound via the Cape of Good Hope, the sloop called at Madeira before arriving at Monrovia, Liberia. Sacramento embarked President Warner of Liberia, members of his government, and Maryland Senator John Marshall at Monrovia on 15 January for passage down the African coast to Cape Palmas. Subsequently, Sacramento proceeded southward, calling at St. George del Mina, Dutch Guinea; St. Thomas; St. Paul Loando; Cape Town; and Madras, India. Soon after departing Madras, Sacramento grounded on 19 June 1867 on reefs at the mouth of the Godavari River, now in the state of Andhra Pradesh. Although battered into a total wreck, all hands from Sacramento were saved and eventually embarked aboard SS General Caulfield which arrived in New York on 19 November.

== See also ==
- List of sloops of war of the United States Navy
- Bibliography of early American naval history
- Confederate States Navy
- Union Navy
- Union Blockade
