= Hugh King (Medal of Honor) =

US Navy sailor

- Born: c. 1845; Ireland
- Military career
- Allegiance: United States
- Branch: United States Navy
- Rank: Ordinary Seaman
- Unit: USS Iroquois
- Awards: Medal of Honor

Hugh King (born c. 1845, date of death unknown) was a United States Navy sailor and a recipient of the United States military's highest decoration, the Medal of Honor.

A native of Ireland, King immigrated to the United States and joined the Navy from New York in July 1871. By September 7, 1871, he was serving as an ordinary seaman on the USS Iroquois. On that day, while Iroquois was in the Delaware River, he jumped overboard and rescued a shipmate from drowning. For this action, he was awarded the Medal of Honor ten months later, on July 9, 1872.

King's official Medal of Honor citation reads:

On board the U.S.S. Iroquois, Delaware River, 7 September 1871. Jumping overboard at the imminent risk of his life, King rescued one of the crew of that vessel from drowning.

== See also ==
- List of Medal of Honor recipients during peacetime
