= USS Julia (1863) =

Tender of the United States Navy

History

United States
- In service: 15 February 1863
- Out of service: 1865
- Captured: 8 January 1863
- Fate: broken up, 1865

General characteristics
- Displacement: 10 tons
- Propulsion: sail
- Complement: 7

USS Julia was a sloop captured by the Union Navy during the American Civil War. She was used by the Union Navy as a tender ship in support of the Union Navy.

== Service history ==
Julia was an English sloop operating out of Nassau, Bahamas, captured by Union gunboat Sagamore on 8 January 1863. When taken some 10 miles north of Jupiter Inlet, Florida, she was attempting to slip through the Union blockade laden with salt badly needed by the Confederacy. She was taken to Key West, Florida, where she was condemned by a prize court and sold to the U.S. Navy. She was placed in service 15 February 1863, with Acting Master's Mate L. C. Coggeshall in charge, and used as a tender to Northern blockaders along the coast. Tahoma, Pursuit, and Eugenie were among the ships she assisted during the war. On 20 February 1863, she shared in the capture of the bark Stonewall. Julia was sold and broken up at Key West in 1865.
