= USS Juniata (1862) =

Sloops-of-war of the United States Navy

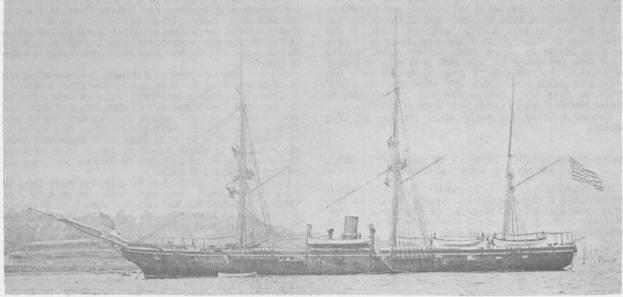
- USS Juniata (1862)

History

United States
- Name: USS Juniata
- Namesake: The Juniata River
- Builder: Philadelphia Navy Yard, Philadelphia, Pennsylvania
- Launched: 20 March 1862
- Sponsored by: Miss Angela Turner
- Commissioned: 4 December 1862
- Decommissioned: 29 June 1867
- Recommissioned: 19 July 1869
- Decommissioned: 10 July 1872
- Recommissioned: 10 February 1873
- Decommissioned: 1 September 1876
- Recommissioned: 30 October 1882
- Decommissioned: 28 February 1889
- Fate: Sold 25 March 1891

General characteristics
- Type: Steam Sloop-of-war
- Tonnage: 1240
- Draft: 15 ft 3 in (4.65 m)
- Propulsion: Steam engine
- Speed: 9 knots (17 km/h; 10 mph)
- Complement: 160 officers and enlisted
- Armament: 1 × 100-pounder Parrott rifle; 1 × 11 in (280 mm) smoothbore Dahlgren gun; 4 × 30-pounder Parrott rifles; 1 × 12-pounder gun; 4 × 24-pounder howitzers

The first USS Juniata was a sloop of war in the United States Navy during the American Civil War.

Juniata was named for the Juniata River. She was launched at Philadelphia Navy Yard on 20 March 1862; sponsored by Miss Angela Turner; and commissioned there on 4 December, Commander John M. B. Glitz in command. Juniata was one of four sister ships of her class which included Adirondack, Housatonic and Ossipee.

== Service history ==
=== North Atlantic Blockading Squadron ===
Scheduled for service in the West Indies, Juniata was temporarily assigned to the North Atlantic Blockading Squadron and stationed at Norfolk, Virginia, where her guns could help defend the area while machinery defects were corrected at the Navy Yard. She departed Hampton Roads for the West Indies on 26 April 1863 and four days later captured schooner Harvest bound for Nassau, New Providence, with a cargo of cotton. She joined the West Indies Squadron at Havana on 5 May. She captured English steamer Victor about 8 miles off Morro Castle, Cuba on 28 May, and on 13 June took the schooner Fashion, loaded with chemicals critically needed by the Confederacy. The next day she captured the English schooner Elizabeth, and the Don Jose on 2 July.

Juniata continued to cruise in the West Indies convoying California-bound ships to safe waters and alertly watching for signs of Confederate cruisers and blockade runners until she sail for New York on 24 November, arriving there 2 December. Under repairs at Philadelphia during the first half of 1864, Juniata departed on 12 August in search of Confederate cruiser Tallahassee reported off Sandy Hook, New Jersey. Five days later she anchored in Hampton Roads and joined the North Atlantic Blockading Squadron. She operated out of Hampton Roads until steaming to Wilmington early in December in preparation for forthcoming offensive operations against that powerful stronghold and blockade running center.

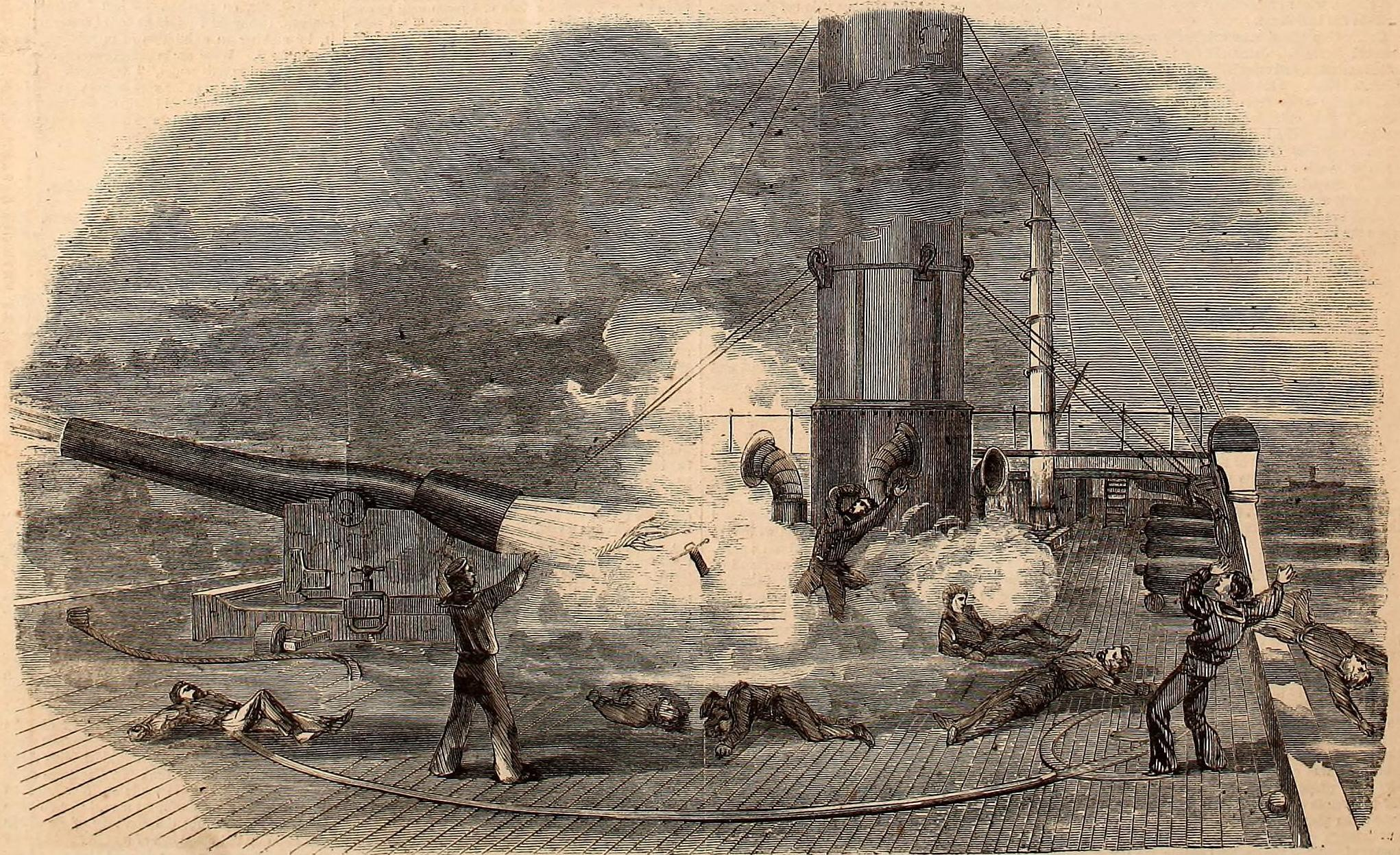
Bursting of the 100-pound Parrott gun on board the Juniata, December 24, 1864; Harper's Weekly

She was in the thick of the fighting during the first attack on Fort Fisher December 23–27, closing Southern batteries to get in position for effective bombardment. Her daring upon this occasion, which cost her two officers and three men killed and 11 men wounded, was again displayed during the second attack on Fort Fisher between 13 January and 15 January 1865. Five more of her men were killed and 10 wounded in this assault which wrestled Wilmington from Southern hands, sealing off the Confederacy from effective foreign aid.

=== South Atlantic Blockading Squadron ===
Juniata was transferred to the South Atlantic Blockading Squadron on 18 January 1865 and arrived Charleston Roads the next day. After a brief visit to Port Royal, South Carolina, to repair some of the damage sustained in the furious action at Fort Fisher, she participated in the expedition to Bull's Bay in support of General William Sherman's drive north through 17 February.

Juniata received orders on 23 February to cruise along the coast of Brazil as far south as Buenos Aires protecting American citizens and interests. After extensive repairs she departed Port Royal on this assignment on 17 June and arrived Bahia, Brazil, 8 August bringing that city its new United States consul. With the exception of a cruise to the coast of Africa from 12 June to 30 September 1866, she remained in South American waters until 30 April 1867 when she sailed from Rio de Janeiro for home, arriving Philadelphia on 24 June.

Juniata decommissioned at Philadelphia Navy Yard on 29 June and remained there until recommissioned 19 July 1869 and departed for Europe. She served, in European waters until 18 June 1872 when she sailed for the United States arriving Boston Navy Yard on 29 June. She decommissioned 10 July. During this period she was commanded by future founder of the Naval War College, Stephen B. Luce.

=== Polaris search ===
Juniata recommissioned on 10 February 1873 serving on the northeast coast until 26 June when she got underway for St. John's, Newfoundland en route to the west coast of Greenland to assist Tigress in her quest for survivors of Polaris which had come to grief exploring the Arctic with Charles Francis Hall. Juniata steamed as far north as Upernavik some 250 miles above Godhaven, Greenland, where she supplied Tigress. She returned to New York 1 November 1873.

After a cruise to the Caribbean, Juniata sailed for the European Station on 6 May 1874 and remained on duty there until she returned to the United States, arriving Baltimore, Maryland on 6 February 1876. During the voyage back to the United States, Juniata discovered the German schooner Avance in distress, with her crew sick. Five sailors were put aboard Avance and she was taken in to São Jorge Island, Cape Verde Islands. While at Philadelphia, Pennsylvania on 21 August, Seaman John Osborne saved a shipmate from drowning, for which he was awarded the Medal of Honor. Juniata decommissioned at Norfolk on 1 September.

=== Circumnavigation ===
Juniata recommissioned at New York Navy Yard on 30 October 1882, Comdr. George Dewey in command, and departed on a voyage which took her around the world through the Strait of Gibraltar, the Suez Canal, to Bombay, Batavia, Singapore, and Hong Kong, among her many ports of call. She returned to New York on 10 December 1885 and operated from that port until she sailed for the Pacific on 16 August 1886. She again returned to New York on 4 February 1889 and decommissioned 28 February 1889. Juniata was sold for $15,890 at Navy Yard, Portsmouth, New Hampshire, 25 March 1891, to Herbert H. Ives. There is an oil painting by Hector Leardie of the ship in a typhoon in the China Sea dated 29 and 30 September 1888, Hector Leardie was master.
