= USS Omaha (1869) =

Sloops-of-war of the United States Navy

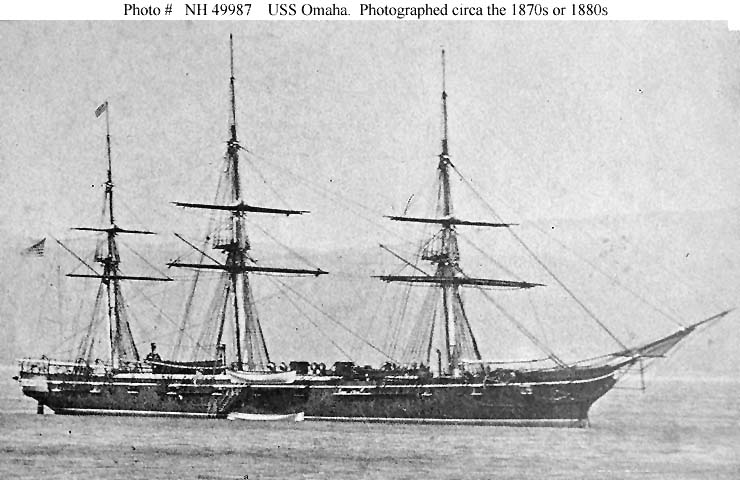
- USS Omaha

History

United States
- Name: USS Omaha
- Builder: Philadelphia Navy Yard
- Laid down: 1867, as Astoria
- Launched: 10 June 1869
- Commissioned: 12 September 1872
- Decommissioned: 1891
- Stricken: 10 July 1914
- Fate: Sold

General characteristics
- Type: Screw sloop
- Displacement: 2,394 long tons (2,432 t)
- Length: 250 ft 6 in (76.35 m)
- Beam: 38 ft (12 m)
- Draft: 17 ft 6 in (5.33 m)
- Speed: 11.3 knots (20.9 km/h; 13.0 mph)
- Armament: 1 × 11 in (280 mm) gun; 10 × 9 in (230 mm) guns; 1 × 60-pounder gun; 2 × 20-pounder guns

The first USS Omaha was laid down in 1867 by the Philadelphia Navy Yard as Astoria; launched 10 June 1869; she was renamed Omaha on 10 August 1869; and commissioned 12 September 1872, Captain John C. Febiger in command.

== Service history ==
=== Atlantic Stations, 1873–1879 ===
Omaha's first assignment was with the South Atlantic Squadron, and she served alternately on South and North Atlantic Stations from 1873 to 1879. From 1880 to 1884, Omaha was laid up in ordinary at Philadelphia, for a complete refit. By 1885 she was en route to the Asiatic Station via Cape Horn.

=== Statue of Liberty, 1885 ===
Captain Thomas Oliver Selfridge Jr., of the U. S. man-of-war Omaha, delegated a lieutenant to present his compliments to Captain De Saune, the French commander of the Isère, laden with the Statue of Liberty, and suggest that Gravesend Bay would be a safer anchorage than the Sandy Hook Horseshoe.

=== Asiatic Station, 1885–1891 ===
Omaha served on the Asiatic Station from 1885 to 1891. In 1887, the captain of the ship, Thomas O. Selfridge Jr., conducted target practice off the coast of the Japanese island of Ikeshima which resulted in the deaths of four Japanese and the wounding of seven others. This created an international incident but Selfridge was acquitted at a court martial in 1888. In 1890, on the night of 8 February, she put ashore a detachment of officers and men to assist in fighting an extensive fire in the town of Hodogaya, Japan, on request of the United States Consul-General.

=== Marine Hospital Service, 1891–1914 ===
In 1891, Omaha returned to Mare Island Navy Yard, where she decommissioned and was placed in ordinary. She never recommissioned, but later was turned over to the Marine Hospital Service, (which later became the U.S.Public Health Service) and subsequently anchored at Angel Island, California for use as a quarantine barge. Omaha served in this capacity until 1914, after which she was scrapped.

== See also ==
- List of sloops of war of the United States Navy
- Bibliography of early American naval history
