= USS Rosalie =

Gunboat of the United States Navy

History

United States
- Acquired: 6 May 1863
- Commissioned: June 1863
- Decommissioned: June 1865
- Captured: by the Union Navy, 16 March 1863
- Fate: Sold, 28 June 1865

General characteristics
- Displacement: 28 tons
- Length: 45 ft (14 m)
- Beam: 17 ft (5.2 m)
- Draft: 3 ft 6 in (1.07 m)
- Depth of hold: 5 ft (1.5 m)
- Propulsion: sail
- Armament: one 12-pounder smoothbore gun

USS Rosalie was a captured Confederate sloop acquired by the Union Navy from the prize court during the American Civil War.

She was put into service by the Union Navy to patrol navigable waterways of the Confederacy to prevent the South from trading with other countries. She served primarily as a ship's tender, but, occasionally, she served as a gunboat to capture blockade runners she encountered.

== Service history ==
The sloop Rosalie, commanded by Master W. R. Postell, was intercepted and seized on 16 March 1863 by USS Octorara while attempting to run cargo from Bermuda into the besieged port of Charleston, South Carolina. Sent to Key West, Florida, for adjudication, she was purchased by the Navy on 6 May 1863; fitted out as a tender; and commissioned in June 1863, Acting Ensign Charles P. Clark in command. Assigned duty as tender to the blockading vessel at Charlotte Harbor, Florida, until December 1864, Rosalie arrived at Charlotte Harbor in mid-June. On 6 July she sighted her first large blockade runner, the schooner Ann accompanied by a small sloop; and a 3-day chase up Peace Creek ensued. On the 7th, Rosalie, frequently grounding in shallow waters, was joined by two cutters from USS Restless. On the 8th, the American seamen took their cotton-laden quarry.

By 18 July Rosalie had added one sponging vessel and another small sloop to her list of captures. On 1 August she took the British schooner Georgie into custody after spotting her, deserted and empty of cargo, hidden up the Caloosahatchee River. On the 7th, she intercepted a small sailboat; took the three occupants prisoner on suspicion of espionage; and sent them to Key West, Florida. On 30 September she captured another British schooner and in October added patrols at Estero Bay to her mission. During the winter of 1863–64, and into the spring and summer of the latter year, Rosalie supported Army operations along the west coast of central Florida. Such missions, however, primarily involved transportation of scouts or protection of refugees and seldom took her far from Charlotte Harbor. On 9 June 1864, Rosalie seized her only prize steamer, Emma, as that wood burner attempted to smuggle coal to Rebel forces. Four months later she took her last prize, another sponging vessel. In December 1864, Rosalie departed Charlotte Harbor for the last time and took up guard vessel duty at Boca Chica, Florida. She remained on that duty through the end of the Civil War and at the end of May 1865 was designated for disposal through sale at Key West. Decommissioned in June, she was sold at public auction on the 28th to a Mr. Benjamin Roberts.

== See also ==
- Blockade runners of the American Civil War
- Blockade mail of the Confederacy
