= USS Connecticut =

USS Connecticut may refer to the following ships that were operated by the United States:

- USS Connecticut (1776) was a gundalow that served with the Continental Army during the American Revolutionary War
- USS Connecticut (1799) served during the Quasi-War
- USS Connecticut (1861) was a sidewheel steamer launched in 1861 and in service during the American Civil War
- USS Pompanoosuc, Wampanoag-class frigate whose building began in 1863, was renamed Connecticut on 15 May 1869, but never launched; broken up in 1884
- USS Connecticut (1899) was a monitor renamed during construction and commissioned as USS Nevada
- USS Connecticut (BB-18) was a Connecticut-class battleship, flagship of the Great White Fleet and saw action during World War I
- USS Connecticut (SSN-22) is the second Seawolf-class submarine currently in service
