= Algoma-class sloop =

American screw sloops (1869–1891)

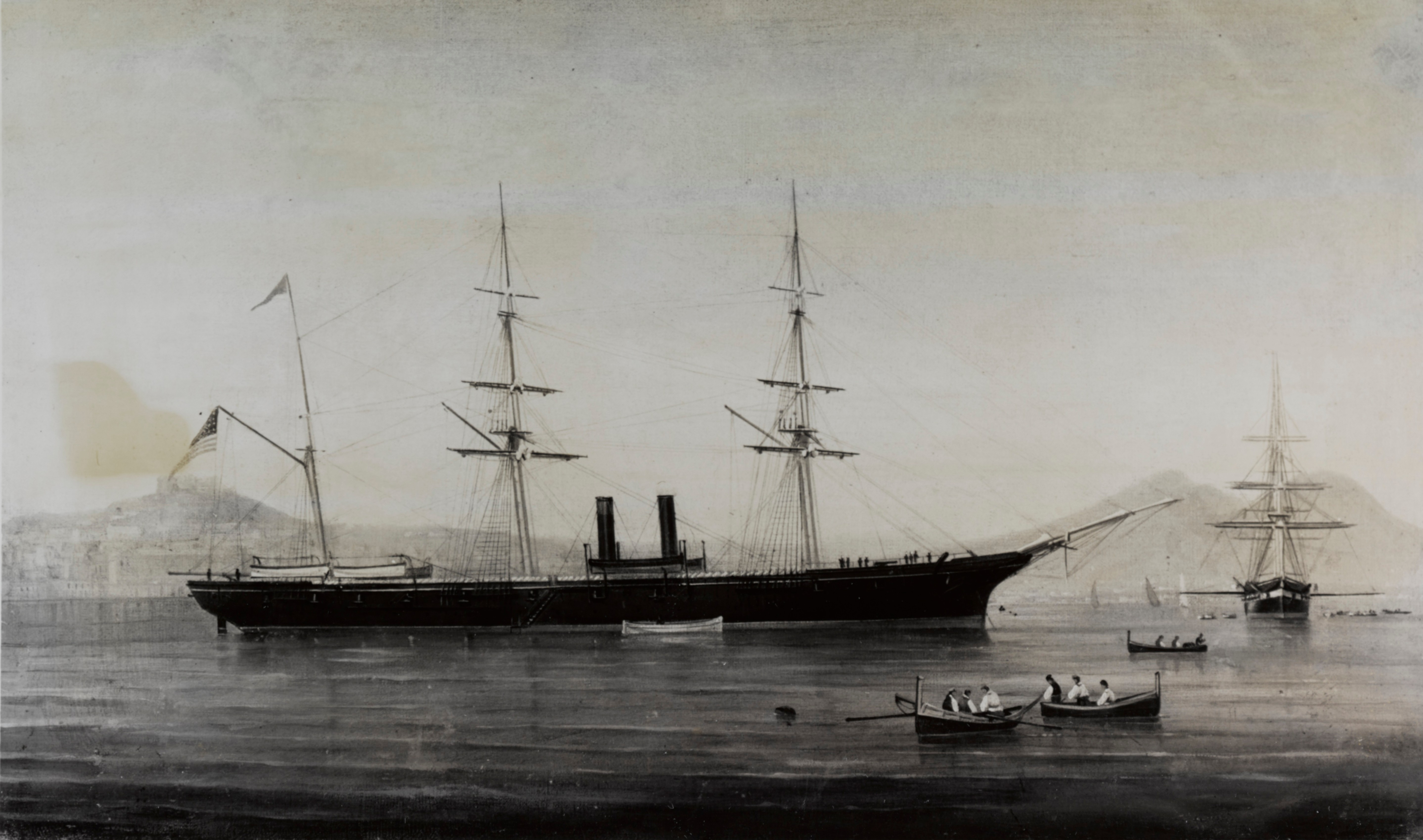
- Painting of USS Plymouth from 1884

Class overview
- Name: Algoma class
- Builders: Boston Navy Yard; Portsmouth Navy Yard; Brooklyn Navy Yard; Philadelphia Navy Yard
- Operators: United States Navy
- Preceded by: Ticonderoga-class sloops
- Built: 1867–1868
- In service: 1869–1891
- Planned: 11
- Completed: 4
- Retired: 4

General characteristics
- Class & type: Screw sloop
- Displacement: 2,394 long tons (2,681 short tons)
- Length: 250.4 ft (76.3 m) lbp
- Beam: 38 ft (12 m)
- Depth: 16.5 ft (5.0 m)
- Propulsion: Sails and steam
- Complement: 291
- Armament: 10 × 9 in (23 cm) guns; 1 × 60 lb (27 kg) rifle; 1 × 11 in (28 cm)-inch pivot gun

The Alaska or Algoma-class sloop was a series of screw sloops operated by the US Navy during the later parts of the 19th century. Designed during the American Civil War, only 4 of the 11 planned ships were built, all after the war's end. The class had a brief service life and were all out of service by the early 1890s.

== Development and design ==
Following the end of the American Civil War, the Union Navy transitioned between wartime mass production and began to develop doctrine for the post-war era. Development of the class began in 1864 with the construction of the ships' engines, although work on building the ships themselves did not start until 1867. The classes' design was based on the Ticonderoga-class sloops, and was intended to be an economic alternative to the Contoocook-class and Java-class frigates. Of the 11 ships initially planned, only four were laid down as the other engines were redirected for installation on Swatara-class sloops. The rest of the class was cancelled in 1866, and is sometimes referred to as the Alaska-class.

The ships were designed to carry a broadside of ten 9 in (23 cm) guns along with a 60 lb (27 kg) rifle mounted on the bow and a 11 in (28 cm)-inch pivot gun, although the exact loadout varied from ship to ship. They had a length between perpendiculars of 250.4 ft (76.3 m), beam of 38 ft (12 m), depth of 16.5 ft (5.0 m), a displacement of 2,394 long tons (2,681 short tons), and two funnels. The ships carried 150 long tons (170 short tons) of coal which supplied a 950 ihp (710 kW) engine that turned one propeller and a top speed of 12 knots (22 km/h; 14 mph). Including the barque-rigged sails, speeds up to 14.5 knots (26.9 km/h; 16.7 mph) were achieved. The ships had a complement of 291.

== History ==
In 1869, the Secretary of the Navy disapproved of the large number of warships named after Native American tribes and the incoherent naming conventions used across the fleet. As a result, he ordered a systematic renaming of vessels. That year, Algoma was renamed Benicia, Kenosha became Plymouth, and Astoria to Omaha. While in service, the ships spread out across the world as they were attached to different squadrons. Alaska took part in the Korean Expedition in 1871, and the ships were gradually decommissioned by the 1880s. Omaha, the last in use, was rebuilt in the 1880s and was repurposed as a quarantine ship before she was sold off in 1915.

== Ships in class ==
Data
Name	Builder	Laid down	Launched	Commissioned	Decommissioned
Alaska	Boston Navy Yard	1867	31 October 1868	8 December 1869	1883
Benicia	Portsmouth Navy Yard	May 1867	18 August 1868	1 December 1869	29 November 1875
Plymouth	Brooklyn Navy Yard	27 June 1867	8 August 1868	20 January 1869	17 May 1879
Omaha	Philadelphia Navy Yard	1867	10 June 1869	12 September 1871	1891
Confiance	Boston Navy Yard	–	–	–	Cancelled 1866
Detroit	Brooklyn Navy Yard	–	–	–	Cancelled 1866
Meredosia	–	–	–	–	Cancelled 1866
Peacock	Brooklyn Navy Yard	–	–	–	Cancelled 1866
Serapis	Boston Navy Yard	–	–	–	Cancelled 1866
Taghkanic	–	–	–	–	Cancelled 1866
Talladega	–	–	–	–	Cancelled 1866
