= USS Ossipee (1861) =

Gunboat of the United States Navy

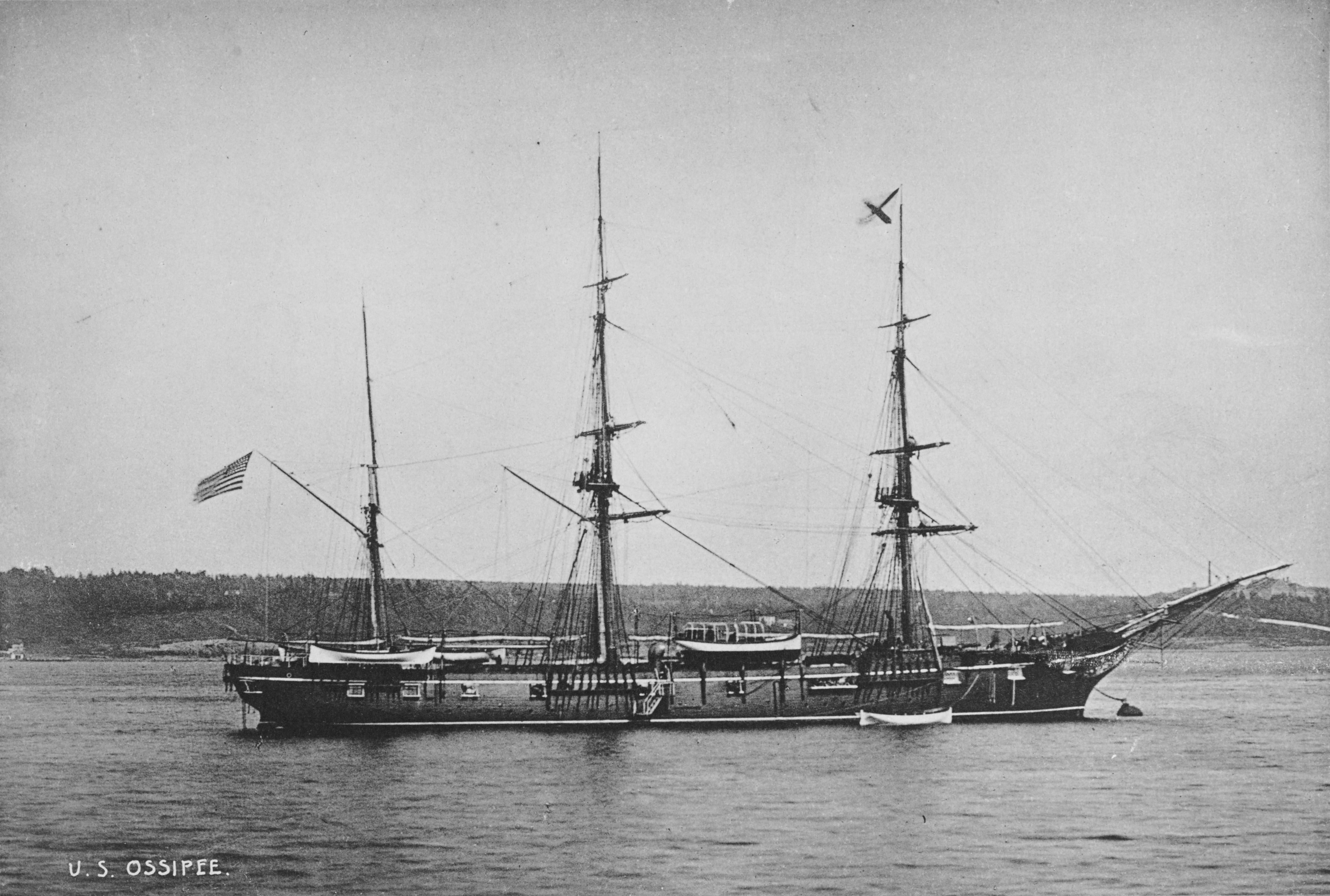
- USS Ossipee in her 1884-1889 configuration, with pivot gun mounted forward of the smokestack

History

United States
- Name: USS Ossipee
- Namesake: Ossipee River
- Builder: Portsmouth Navy Yard, Kittery, Maine
- Cost: $383,787.10 ($13,750,000 today)
- Laid down: June 1861
- Launched: 16 November 1861
- Sponsored by: Mrs. McFarland
- Commissioned: 06 Nov 1862 – 03 Jul 1865; 27 Oct 1866 – 30 Nov 1872; 10 Oct 1873 – 25 May 1878; 28 Jan 1884 – 12 Nov 1889
- Fate: Sold 25 March 1891

General characteristics
- Type: Screw sloop-of-war
- Displacement: 1,240 long tons (1,260 t)
- Length: 207 ft (63 m)
- Beam: 38 ft (12 m)
- Draft: 16 ft (4.9 m)
- Depth of hold: 16 ft 10 in (5.13 m)
- Installed power: 2-cyl., 700 ihp horizontal back-acting
- Propulsion: Single screw
- Speed: 10 knots (19 km/h; 12 mph)
- Complement: 141 officers and enlisted
- Armament: 1 × 100-pounder Parrott rifle; 1 × 11 in (280 mm) smoothbore Dahlgren gun; 3 × 30-pounder Dahlgren rifles; 6 × 32-pounder guns; 1 × heavy 12-pounder smoothbore gun; 1 × 12-pounder rifle

The first USS Ossipee was a wooden, screw sloop-of-war in commission in the United States Navy at various times between 1861 and 1889. She served in the Union Navy during the American Civil War. She was named for the Ossipee River of New Hampshire and Maine. The USS Ossipee was present during the Alaska Purchase.

== Construction ==
Ossipee's keel was laid down in June 1861 by the Portsmouth Navy Yard, Kittery, Maine; launched 16 November 1861; sponsored by Mrs. McFarland, wife of the editor of the Concord Statesman; and commissioned 6 November 1862 Lieutenant Commander Robert Boyd in command. She was powered by a two-cylinder horizontal back-acting steam engine with unknown bore and stroke, (Note: Ossipee's sister ship Juniata had a similar if not identical engine with bore of 42 inches and stroke of 30.) driving a single screw propeller. Her engines were built in Mystic, Connecticut by the Reliance Machine Company for the sum of $93,000 (equivalent to $3,330,000 in 2025). Total cost of the vessel was $383,787.10 ($13,750,000). Ossipee was one of four sister ships which included Adirondack, Housatonic and Juniata.

== Service history ==
=== Civil War, 1862–1865 ===
Ten days later Captain John P. Gillis took command of the ship and she got underway for Hampton Roads to join the North Atlantic Blockading Squadron in which she served until departing Newport News, Virginia, 18 May 1863 to join the West Gulf Blockading Squadron off Mobile, Alabama. She captured schooner Helena there 30 June and with USS Kennebec seized steamers James Battle and William Bagley in the Gulf of Mexico on 18 July. The former, "the finest packet on the Alabama River...altered to suit her for a blockade runner," was laden with cotton and rosin while the latter carried cotton which they hoped to sell abroad.

In September Ossipee steamed to the coast of Texas for blockade duty until returning to station off Mobile in mid-March 1864 as Admiral David Farragut built up his forces for the invasion of Mobile Bay. On 5 August, with USS Itasca alongside, she passed the forts and entered Mobile Bay with Farragut and participated in the ensuing naval battle, playing a large role in the struggle with CSS Tennessee which finally forced the well fought, heavy southern ironclad ram to surrender.

In September Ossipee returned to blockade duty off the Texas coast and, but for repairs at Pensacola, Florida late in 1864, served there until moving to New Orleans, Louisiana in April 1865. She was one of the Federal ships to pursue CSS Webb during the Confederate steamer’s daring attempt to race down the Mississippi River and escape to sea.

Following duty off Mobile, Ossipee sailed North late in June and decommissioned at Philadelphia, Pennsylvania on 3 July.

=== Pacific, 1866–1872 ===
Recommissioned 27 October 1866, Captain George F. Emmons in command, Ossipee served in the north Pacific protecting American interests along the coasts of Mexico and Central America. She departed San Francisco 27 September 1867 for Sitka, Alaska, carrying Russian Commissioners for the ceremony transferring Alaska to the United States on 18 October.

After serving in the Pacific into the spring of 1872, Ossipee headed home on 6 June. On 20 June, Seaman James Benson jumped overboard to rescue a shipmate, for which he was later awarded the Medal of Honor. Ossipee arrived in New York on 18 November, and was decommissioned there on the 30th.

=== North Atlantic, 1873–1878 ===
Recommissioned 10 October 1873, the veteran sloop of war served in the North Atlantic. She departed Key West 15 December for Dry Tortugas to await filibustering steamer Virginius which had been seized on the high seas by the Spanish corvette Tornado under fraudulent American registry. To help ease tension caused by the Virginius Affair, Spain had turned the prize over to the United States, represented by Captain Whiting, commander of USS Despatch at Bahia Honda, Cuba. Despatch took Virginius to Tortugas. Ossipee departed Tortugas 19 December towing Virginius north, but the notorious prize foundered off Cape Hatteras a week later. Ossipee continued operations in the North Atlantic until decommissioning at Boston 25 May 1878.

=== Asiatic Squadron, Atlantic, 1884–1891 ===
Recommissioned 28 January 1884, Ossipee departed Hampton Roads 30 April for the Far East via Gibraltar and the Suez Canal and served on the Asiatic station until returning to New York 15 February 1887. She then served along the Atlantic coast and in the West Indies until decommissioning at Norfolk, Virginia 12 November 1889. She was sold there 25 March 1891 to Herbert H. Ives.
