= USS Canandaigua (1862) =

Gunboat of the United States Navy

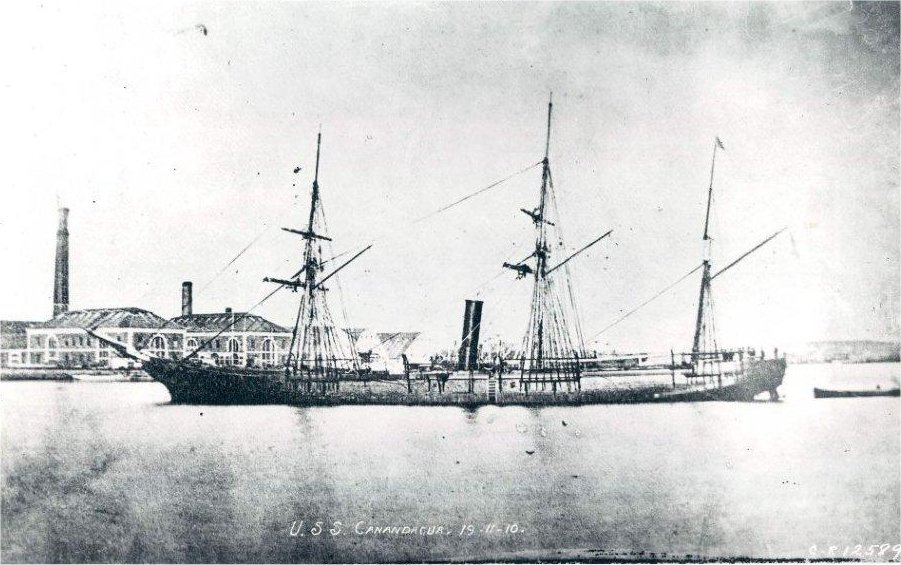
- USS Canandaigua on November 19, 1870.

History

United States
- Name: USS Canandaigua
- Namesake: Canandaigua Lake and Canandaigua, New York
- Builder: Boston Navy Yard, Charlestown, Massachusetts
- Launched: March 28, 1862
- Commissioned: August 1, 1862
- Decommissioned: April 8, 1865
- Recommissioned: November 22, 1865
- Renamed: USS Detroit May 15, 1869
- Namesake: Detroit, Michigan
- Renamed: USS Canandaigua August 10, 1869
- Decommissioned: November 8, 1875
- Fate: Scrapped 1884

General characteristics
- Type: Sloop-of-war
- Displacement: 1,395 long tons (1,417 t)
- Length: 228 ft (69 m)
- Beam: 38 ft 5 in (11.71 m)
- Draft: 15 ft (4.6 m)
- Propulsion: Sail, with steam engine screw
- Speed: 10 kn (12 mph; 19 km/h)
- Armament: 2 × 11 in (280 mm) smoothbore guns, 1 × 8 in (200 mm) smoothbore gun, 3 × 20-pounder rifles

USS Canandaigua was a sloop-of-war which displaced 1,395 long tons (1,417 t), with steam engine screw, acquired by the Union Navy during the second year of the American Civil War. After the war, Canandaigua was retained and placed in operation in Europe and elsewhere.

With heavy guns (three of them rifled) and speed of 10 kn (12 mph; 19 km/h), the USS Canandaigua was an ideal and successful gunboat in the Union blockade of the Confederate States of America.

== Service history ==
Canandaigua—a screw sloop—was launched on March 28, 1862, by Boston Navy Yard, and commissioned on August 1, 1862, with Commander J. F. Green in command. Canandaigua reported to the South Atlantic Blockading Squadron off Charleston, South Carolina on August 26, 1862, adding to the Union capability to isolate the Confederacy from overseas supplies. Off Charleston on May 15, 1863, Canandaigua took the sloop Secesh; later she destroyed another blockade runner, and aided in the capture of a schooner and a steamer in the same area. In addition to blockading, Canandaigua cooperated with Union Army forces taking part in the long series of attacks on positions in Charleston harbor in 1863–1864. On February 17, 1864, she rescued 150 members of the crew of Housatonic when she fell victim to the historic attack of the Confederate submarine CSS H. L. Hunley.

Canandaigua sailed for the Boston Navy Yard on March 26, 1865, and was decommissioned there on April 8. Recommissioned on November 22, Canandaigua cruised on the European Station until February 1869, when she began three years of repairs at New York Navy Yard. She was renamed Detroit on May 15, 1869, but returned to her original name on August 10. Her last cruise (1872–1875) was in the West Indies and Gulf of Mexico with the North Atlantic Station's detachment there. Out of commission at Norfolk Navy Yard after November 8, 1875, she remained in ordinary until broken up in 1884.
