= Screw sloop =

Propeller-driven sloop-of-war

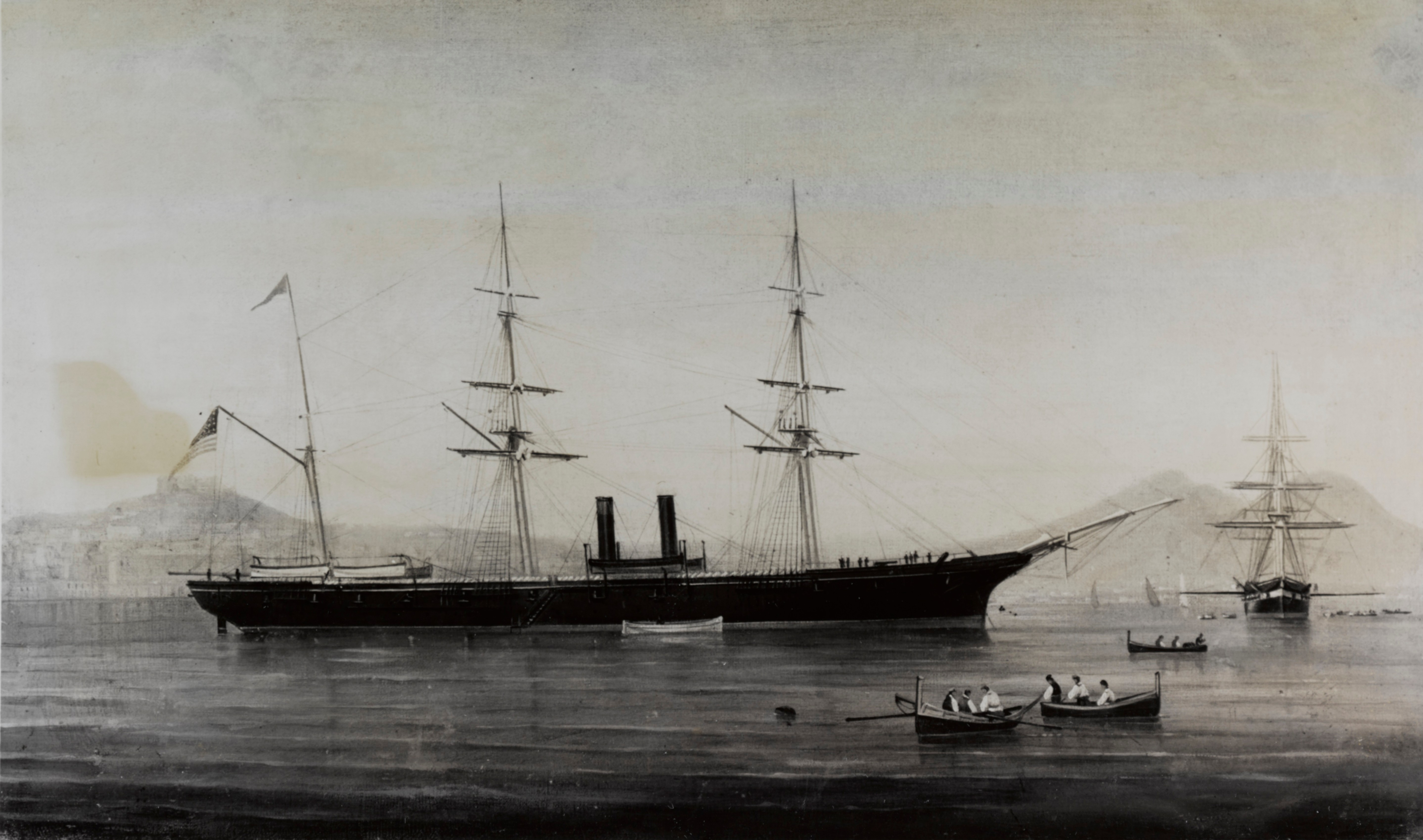
USS Plymouth, an Algoma-class screw sloop

A screw sloop is a propeller-driven sloop-of-war. They were popularized in the mid-19th century, during the introduction of the steam engine and the transition of fleets to this new technology.

== The sailing sloop ==
=== The British sloop in the Age of Sail ===
In the Age of Sail, there was a large variety of terms to describe sailing vessels. In British English, the meaning of the term 'sloop' depends on the context. The main source of confusion about the term sloop, is that for commercial vessels, 'sloop' referred and refers to a vessel with a single mast rigged fore-and-aft. If the term referred to a British warship, its meaning was heavily dependent on the number of officers and men on the vessel. Under the rating system of the Royal Navy, any vessel that did not require a post-captain as commander was a sloop. This generally referred to all vessels with fewer than 20 guns. By this system, small frigates that lost most of their guns and sailors so they could be used as transports would be reclassified as sloops. The same logic also applied to fireships, which were typically made by converting fifth- or sixth-rate ships.

In the late 17th century, sloops were generally ketch-rigged bomb vessels or generally ship-rigged fireships. After the start of the Seven Years' War in 1756, most sloops were designed to have three masts.

== Under steam ==
Steam vessels driven by propellers were differentiated from those driven by paddle-wheels by referring to the ship's screws (propellers). Other propeller-driven warships included the heavier steam corvette and the lighter gun vessel.

=== The United Kingdom ===
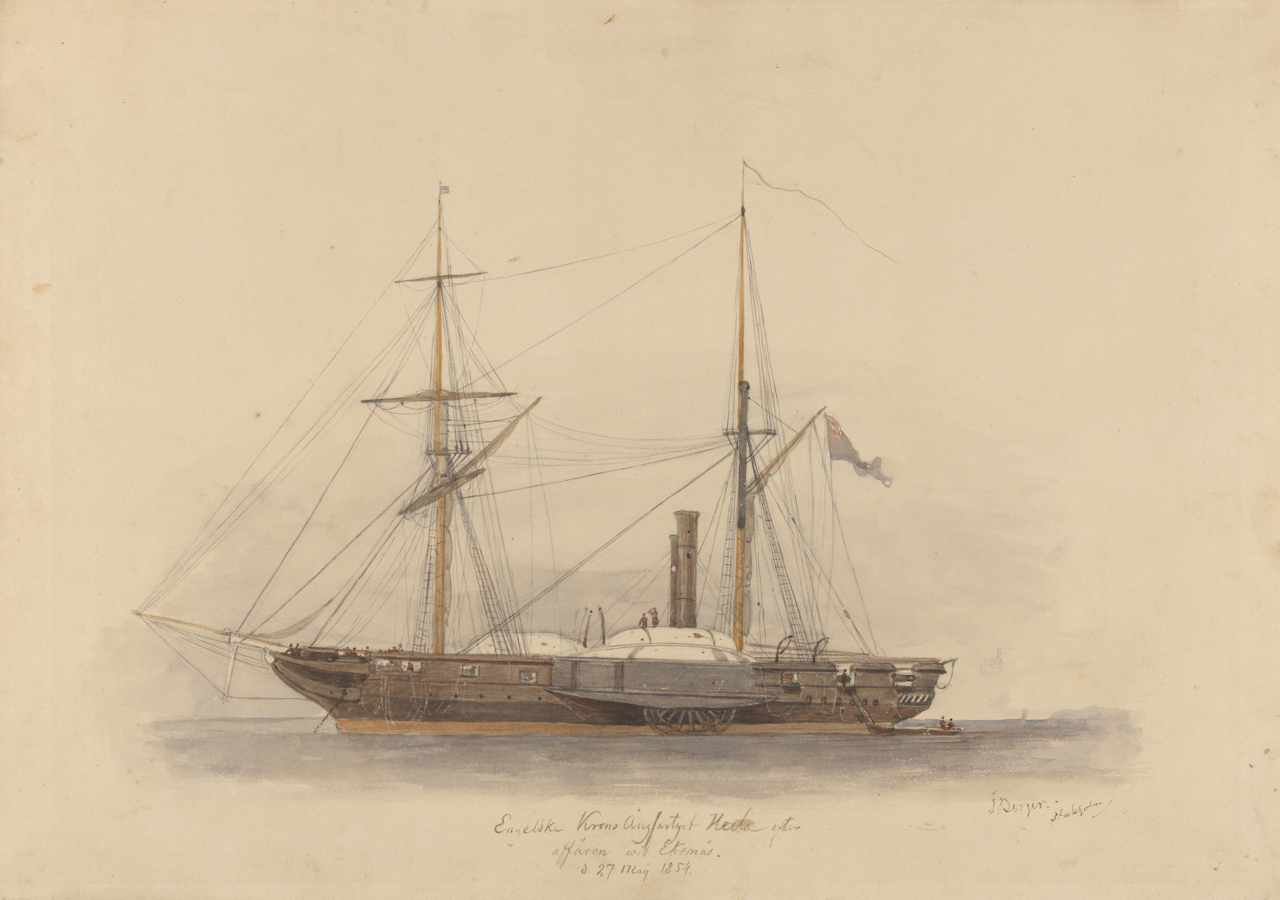
The Hydra-class sloop Hecla in 1854

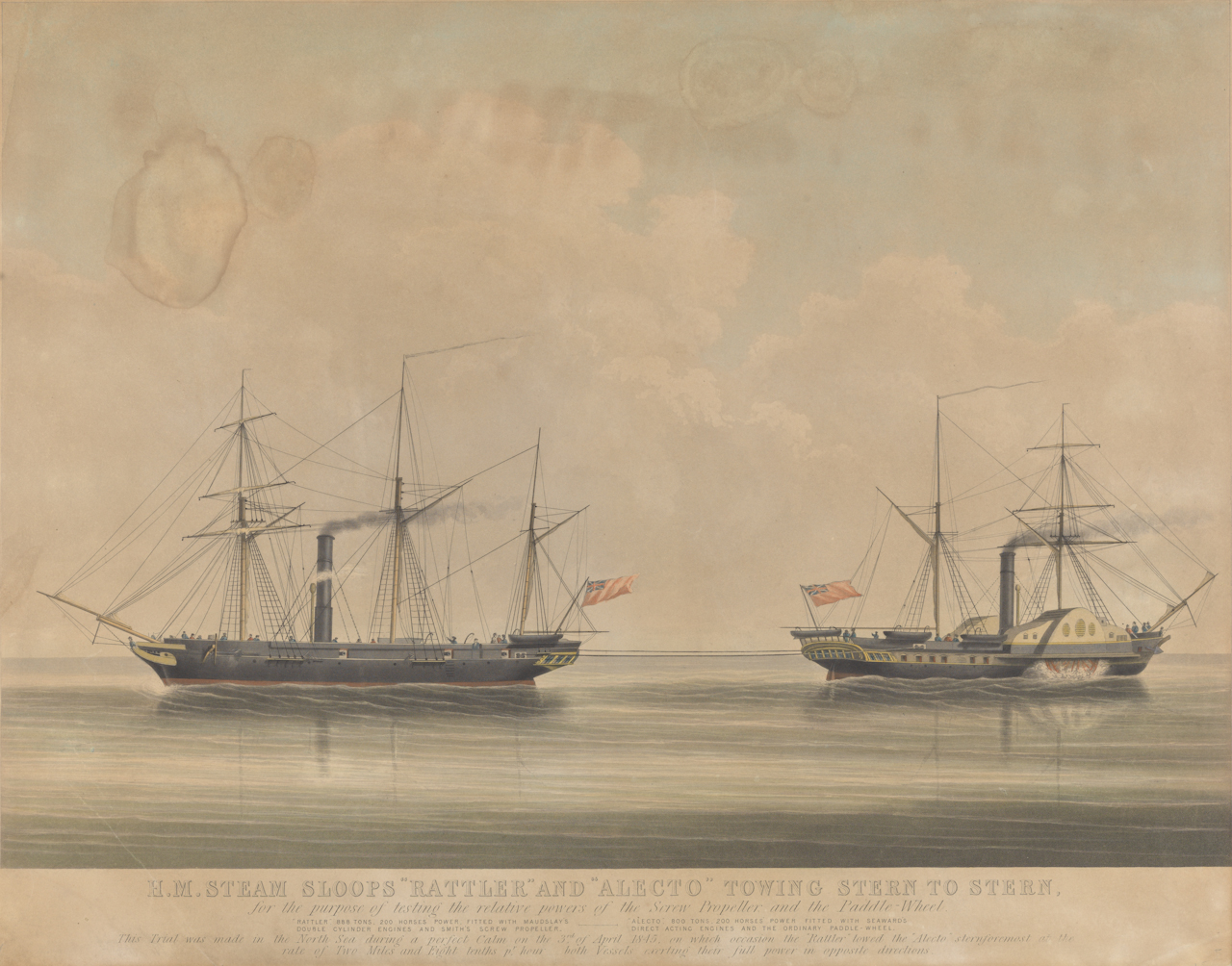
Screw sloop Rattler vs paddle sloop Alecto in 1845

By 1833, the Royal Navy's vessels fell into three classes:

1. Rated ships and yachts, commanded by captains
2. Sloops and bomb vessels, commanded by commanders.
3. All other smaller vessels, commanded by lieutenants and inferior officers.

At the time, sloops could be ships (with three masts) or brigs (with two masts) or be corvette-built (also with three masts) or otherwise. The term sloop referred to a sailing vessel. Small paddle steamers like HMS Rhadamanthus, Meteor, and Firebrand were listed as 'steam vessels'.

In 1840, the steam vessels of the Royal Navy were also divided into classes:

- First class: commanded by captains, e.g. HMS Cyclops and HMS Gorgon
- Second class: commanded by commanders, e.g. HMS Rhadamanthus and the Hydra-class sloop
- Third class: commanded by lieutenants and masters, e.g. Meteor and Firebrand

By 1845, the List of the Royal Navy referred to dozens of 'steam sloops'. Most of these were commanded by a commander, many others had a lieutenant commander. Cyclops was still a steam frigate. Gorgon was now a steam sloop commanded by a captain. Hydra was a steam sloop. Meteor was a steam vessel.

In 1845, the first screw sloop appeared in the Royal Navy. The first four Alecto-class sloops had been launched in 1839–1841. The fifth unit of this class, Rattler, was reordered as a screw-propelled vessel. In spring 1845, comparative trials were held between Rattler and Alecto. The most famous of these was that in which the sloops towed stern to stern, with Rattler towing Alecto backwards at 2.8 knots.

=== In the USA ===
In the 1860s American context, the general meaning of the word 'sloop' was a three-masted square-rigged ship with a full broadside on a single deck. In a looser sense, it could also refer to a three-masted vessel like CSS Alabama, which was a barque and lacked a full broadside.

USS Princeton launched in September 1843, was the first world's screw steam vessel of war. She had been designed by John Ericsson, who had previously applied the screw to commercial boats. Princeton was also revolutionary because it had its engines under the waterline and had an armament that included a very high-caliber wrought-iron gun. This gun proved able to penetrate 4.5 inches (11 cm) of armor. The success of Princeton led the United States Navy to slowly shift to the propeller as means of propulsion.

In 1857 the United States ordered 5 large screw sloops. USS Hartford was a good example of these. Brooklyn also belonged to this order that made the screw sloop popular. In 1858, seven smaller screw sloops were ordered. USS Mohican and Narragansett were examples of these seven.

== See also ==
- CSS Alabama
- USS Alaska
- USS Contoocook
- HMS Gannet, now a museum ship.
- USS Housatonic, sunk by the first successful submarine attack.
- USS Wyoming
- Watergeus-class sloop
- Japanese warship Nisshin
