= Henry Clay Cochrane =

United States Marine Corps general

- Henry Clay Cochrane
- Born: November 7, 1842
- Died: April 27, 1913 (aged 70); Chester, Pennsylvania, U.S.
- Military career
- Allegiance: United States
- Branch: United States Marine Corps
- Service years: 1863–1905
- Rank: Brigadier General
- Conflicts: American Civil War; Spanish–American War; China Relief Expedition

Henry Clay Cochrane (November 7, 1842 – April 27, 1913) was an officer in the United States Marine Corps during the latter half of the 19th century and early 20th century. He participated, most notably, as a newly minted 2nd lieutenant in the American Civil War, and later the Spanish–American War, where he served as executive officer of the 1st Marine Battalion during the 1898 landing at Guantanamo Bay, as well as the Boxer Rebellion of 1900, where he was involved with the China Relief Expedition commanding the 1st Regiment of Marines. At the time of his death in 1913, he was on the retired list as holding the rank of brigadier general.

== Service history ==
During the Civil War, then Lieutenant Cochrane accompanied President Abraham Lincoln as a member of his guard at the dedication ceremony for the new Gettysburg Battlefield Cemetery where Lincoln delivered his famed Gettysburg Address.

Assigned to the steam-sloop USS Plymouth, North Atlantic, West Indies and Centennial Exposition of 1875–78, commanding captain Edward Barrett on the cruise of USS Plymouth five hundred miles up the Mississippi River to Vicksburg, in the spring of 1877.

In the latter part of the 19th century, Henry Clay Cochrane became an ardent advocate for reform within the antiquated Marine Corps. Among other things, his recommendations for changes to the Marine uniform, which had not been updated in 12 years, partly resulted in the adoption of the Eagle, Globe, and Anchor as the new Marine emblem in 1868, a uniform device which is still in use today.

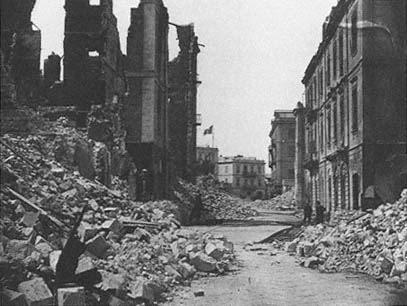
Photo of Alexandria, Egypt after the bombardment and fire of July 11–13, 1882

As a captain serving as the fleet Marine officer on board the sloop-of-war USS Lancaster, flagship of the European Station, he was present at the bombardment of Alexandria, Egypt, by the British Fleet in July 1882. During the operation, he accompanied a landing party along with Lieutenant Littleton W. T. Waller consisting of a mixed bluejacket and Marine force to suppress looting and to protect the U.S. consulate. The Naval landing force of sixty-nine sailors and sixty-three Marines was formed, with Lieutenant Commander Charles Goodrich in command and Captain Cochrane as executive officer. Two companies comprised the force, the sailors under Navy Lieutenant Frank L. Denny and the Marines under Lieutenant Waller. The timely arrival of the ships of the European Squadron and their landing forces gave protection to the American consulate and to American citizens and interests caught up in the fighting and also afforded a refuge for the citizens of other nations who had been displaced from their homes or businesses. Advancing cautiously through the burning and rubble strewn streets, the Americans reached the Grand Square of Mehmet Ali, the heart of the city. The American Consulate was here, and it became the headquarters of the force. Although the French troops had abandoned the city and cautiously returned to their ships, the Marines secured the Grand Square and began to patrol the streets of the European Quarter, as the international business and consular area was called. Cochrane, Waller and their Marines were assigned to Lord Charles Beresford’s British force for the protection of the European Quarter. The anticipated rebel counterattack never came, and a ten-day standoff ended with the arrival of the four thousand-man British relief force. According to the Times of London:

"Lord Charles Beresford states that without the assistance of the American Marines he would have been unable to discharge the numerous duties of suppressing fires, preventing looting, burying the dead, and clearing the streets."

Cochrane was also present at the coronation of Czar Alexander III at Moscow in May, 1883. In 1898, then Major Cochrane was appointed second in command of the 1st Marine Battalion under Lieutenant Colonel Robert W. Huntington and participated in the landing at Guantanamo Bay, Cuba, during the Spanish–American War. During the Boxer Rebellion of 1900, he commanded the 1st Marine Regiment as part of the China Relief Expedition.

Henry Clay Cochrane retired from active duty as a colonel in 1905, bringing to an end 42 years of service in the Marines.

In 1911, he was promoted to brigadier general on the retired list.

General Cochrane died on April 27, 1913, at the age of 71 in Chester, Pennsylvania.

== Memberships ==
After the Civil War, Cochrane was elected as a Veteran Companion the Pennsylvania Commandery of the Military Order of the Loyal Legion of the United States and was assigned insignia number 455. In 1898, following his service in the Spanish-American War, he became a Companion of the Pennsylvania Commandery of the Military Order of Foreign Wars and was assigned insignia number 171.

== Awards ==
- Civil War Campaign Medal
- Spanish Campaign Medal
- China Relief Expedition Medal
