= Thomas Kersey =

United States Navy Medal of Honor recipient

Thomas Joseph Kersey
- Navy Medal of Honor
- Born: August 1846; St. John's, Newfoundland
- Died: April 16, 1888 (aged 41–42); Chelsea, Massachusetts, US
- Burial place: St. Mary's Cemetery, Newport, Rhode Island
- Military career
- Allegiance: United States of America
- Branch: United States Navy
- Rank: Ordinary Seaman
- Unit: USS Plymouth
- Awards: Medal of Honor

Thomas Joseph Kersey (August 1846 – April 16, 1888) was a United States Navy sailor and a recipient of the United States military's highest decoration, the Medal of Honor.

== Military service ==
Born in 1846 in St. John's, Newfoundland, Kersey immigrated to the United States and was living in Everett, Massachusetts, when he joined the Navy on October 19, 1870, for a 3-year enlistment.

By July 26, 1876, he was serving as an ordinary seaman on the 14-gun screw sloop USS Plymouth. On that day, he rescued a crewmate from drowning at the Brooklyn Navy Yard. For this action, he was awarded the Medal of Honor two weeks later, on August 9. Two other Plymouth sailors, Landsman William Corey and Seaman Charles Gidding, attempted to rescue a shipmate from drowning on the same day and also received the medal.

He later served on the USS Wabash and the USS New Hampshire. He was married to Mary C. Egan.

== Medal of Honor citation ==
Rank and organization: Ordinary Seaman, U.S. Navy. Born: 1847, St. John's, Newfoundland. Accredited to: Massachusetts. G.O. No.: 215, 9 August 1876.

Kersey's official Medal of Honor citation reads:

Serving on board the U.S.S. Plymouth at the Navy Yard, New York, 26 July 1876, Kersey displayed bravery and presence of mind in rescuing from drowning one of the crew of that vessel.

== Death and burial ==
Kersey was admitted to the Chelsea Naval Hospital on April 2, 1888, and died there of nephritis (kidney inflammation) on April 16, 1888, at age 41 years and 8 months. He was buried in St. Mary's Cemetery in Newport, Rhode Island.

== See also ==
- List of Medal of Honor recipients during peacetime
