= William R. Redden =

American physician (1881–1952)

William Rufus Redden (1881–1952) was an American public health physician.

== Career ==
Redden graduated B.A. from Bates College in 1906 and worked as a science teacher at Davis & Elkins College in Elkins, West Virginia, before deciding to pursue a medical career. He graduated MD from Harvard Medical School in 1917 and served at Chelsea Naval Hospital 1918–1919, receiving the Navy Cross for bringing down the death rate there during the 1918–1920 flu pandemic.

Redden went on to serve as Director of Medical and Health Activities of the American National Red Cross during relief efforts in response to the 1925 Tri-State tornado and the Great Mississippi Flood of 1927, resigning in 1928 due to ill health. He contributed to the 14th edition of the Encyclopædia Britannica (1929–1930) and in 1931 he became Director of First Aid for the New York Chapter of the American Red Cross. He also taught evening classes at Hunter College, and during the Second World War provided US Coast Guard medical training through Columbia University.

He died at St Mary's Hospital, Brooklyn, on 10 August 1952.
