= Emile Lejeune =

United States Navy sailor

- Born: 1853; France
- Died: July 10, 1916 (aged 62–63); Portland, Maine, U.S.
- Burial place: South Portland, Maine
- Military career
- Allegiance: United States of America
- Branch: United States Navy
- Rank: Seaman
- Unit: USS Plymouth
- Awards: Medal of Honor

Emile Lejeune (1853–1916) was a United States Navy sailor and a recipient of the United States military's highest decoration, the Medal of Honor.

A native of France, Lejeune joined the U.S. Navy from New York. By June 6, 1876, he was serving as a seaman on USS Plymouth commanded by Captain Edward Barrett. On that day, he and other crewmen took Plymouth's steam-powered launch to shore at Port Royal, South Carolina. While there, Lejeune rescued a civilian who had fallen off the Port Royal wharf. For this action, he was awarded the Medal of Honor, proposed by Edward Barrett three days later, on June 9.

Lejeune's official Medal of Honor citation reads:

Serving on board the U.S.S. Plymouth, Lejeune displayed gallant conduct in rescuing a citizen from drowning at Port Royal, S.C., 6 June 1876.

== See also ==
- List of Medal of Honor recipients in non-combat incidents
