= William Corey =

William Corey may refer to:

- William Corey (Medal of Honor) (1853–?), U.S. Navy sailor and Medal of Honor recipient
- William Ellis Corey (1866–1934), president of the Carnegie Steel Company, and of U.S. Steel
- SS William E. Corey, a Great Lakes bulk freighter
