= Albert Weisbogel =

USA Navy sailor

- Born: c. 1844; New Orleans, Louisiana, U.S.
- Died: May 27, 1919 (aged 74–75)
- Burial place: Holy Cross Cemetery, Brooklyn
- Military career
- Allegiance: United States of America
- Branch: United States Navy
- Rank: Captain of the Mizzen Top
- Units: USS Benicia; USS Juniata; USS Plymouth
- Awards: Medal of Honor (2)

Albert Weisbogel (c. 1844 – May 27, 1919) was a 19th-century United States Navy sailor. He was twice awarded America's highest military decoration, the Medal of Honor, for peacetime actions (for which he would now be awarded the Navy and Marine Corps Medal). He is one of only 19 people to be awarded two Medals of Honor, and one of only 14 to be awarded the Medal twice for two separate actions.

== Biography ==
Weisbogel was born in about 1844 in New Orleans, Louisiana. He joined the Navy from Louisiana and by January 11, 1874, was serving on the USS Benicia. On that day, one of his shipmates, a U.S. Marine named Wolf, jumped overboard in a "fit of insanity" in a suicide attempt by drowning. Weisbogel jumped in after and saved him. For this action, he was awarded a Medal of Honor two years later, on March 23, 1876. By that time, he was serving as Captain of the Mizzen Top on the USS Plymouth. Weisbogel also at one point served on the USS Juniata and performed a similar feat on that ship.

Barely a month after being awarded his first Medal of Honor, on April 27, 1876, he again saved a crewmate from drowning. While Plymouth, under the command of Captain Edward Barrett, who proposed his second Medal of Honor, was entering the harbor of Kingston, Jamaica, Landsman Peter J. Kenny fell overboard and was rescued by Weisbogel. For that action he was awarded his second Medal of Honor, on June 9, 1876.

Weisbogel died at age 74 or 75.

== Medal of Honor citations ==
Weisbogel's official Medal of Honor citations are as follows:

First Award

For gallant conduct in jumping overboard from the U.S.S. Benicia, at sea, and rescuing from drowning one of the crew of that vessel on 11 January 1874.

Second Award

For gallant conduct in jumping overboard from the U.S.S. Plymouth, at sea, and rescuing from drowning one of the crew of that vessel on 27 April 1876.

== See also ==
- List of Medal of Honor recipients during Peacetime
