= James Carey (Medal of Honor) =

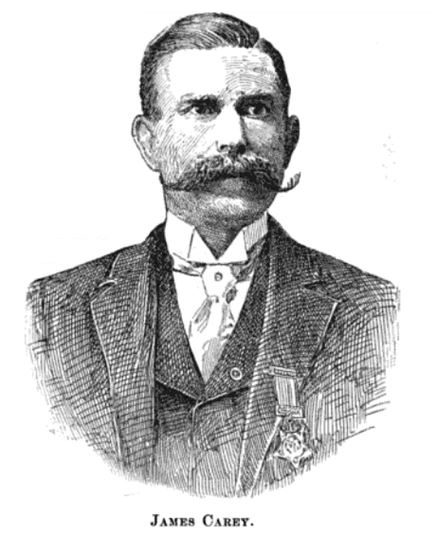
- Photo of James Carey, originally published in The Story of American Heroism, The Werner Company, 1897
- Born: 1844 or 1847; Ireland
- Died: 8 September 1913; Brooklyn, New York, U.S.
- Burial place: Holy Cross Cemetery, Brooklyn, New York
- Military career
- Allegiance: United States of America
- Branch: United States Navy
- Rank: Seaman
- Unit: USS Huron
- Awards: Medal of Honor

James Carey was a United States Navy sailor and a recipient of America's highest military decoration — the Medal of Honor.

== Biography ==
Carey was born in Ireland in either 1844 or 1847, depending on the source. He later served in the U.S. Navy, entering the service from New York City in 1866. In 1868, while a member of the crew of USS Huron, he saved three fellow crewmen from drowning and was awarded the Medal of Honor.

He later served aboard the USS Kansas, and also saved another sailor from drowning.

== Medal of Honor citation ==
Rank and organization: Seaman, U.S. Navy. Born: 1844, Ireland. Accredited to: New York.

Citation:

Seaman on board the U.S.S. Huron, saving 3 shipmates from drowning.

== See also ==
- List of Medal of Honor recipients
- List of Medal of Honor recipients in non-combat incidents
