= USS Caron =

Spruance-class destroyer

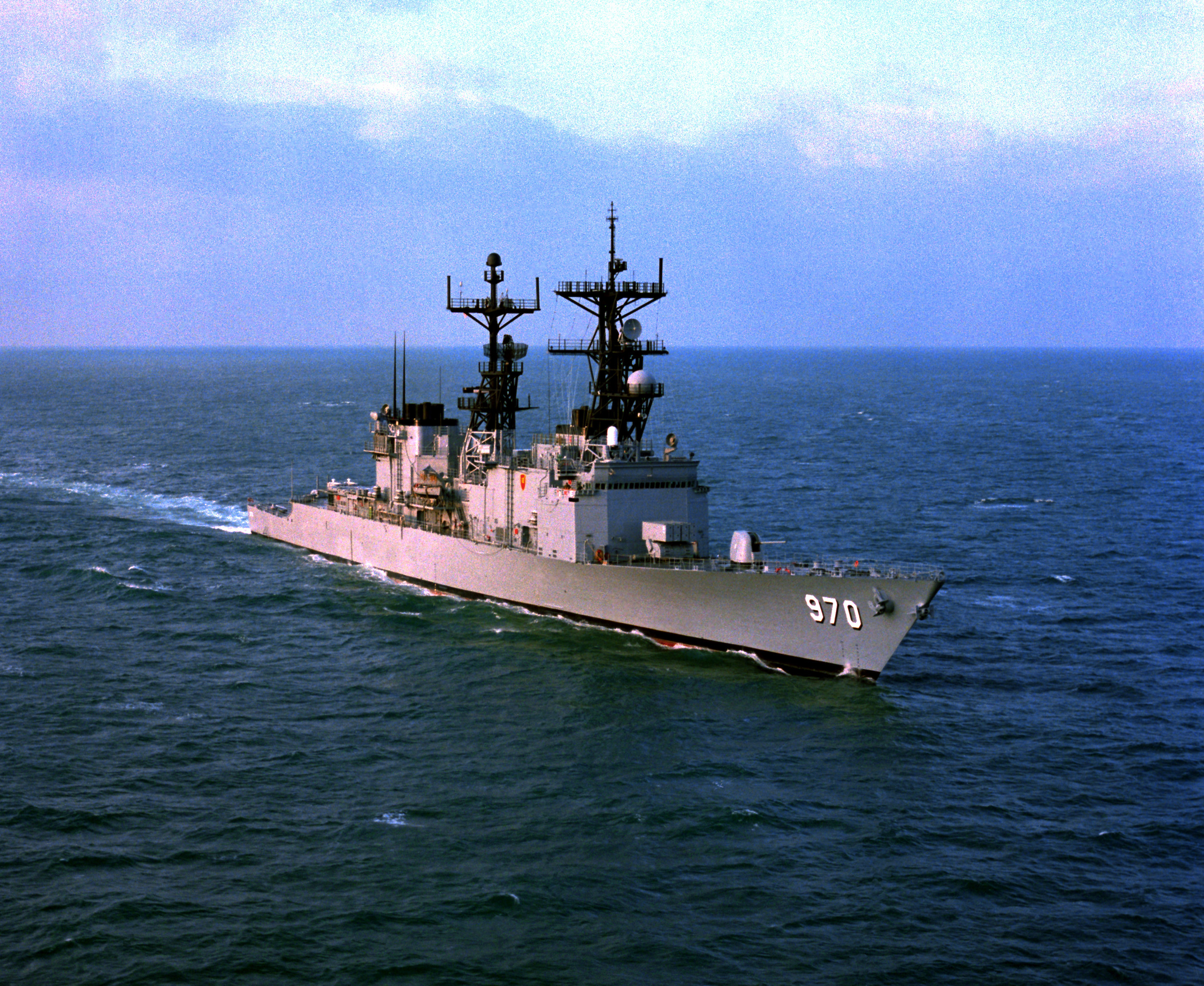
- USS Caron on 1 January 1983

History

United States
- Name: Caron
- Namesake: Wayne Caron
- Ordered: 15 January 1971
- Builder: Ingalls Shipbuilding
- Laid down: 1 July 1974
- Launched: 24 June 1975
- Acquired: 5 September 1977
- Commissioned: 1 October 1977
- Decommissioned: 15 October 2001
- Stricken: 5 June 2002
- Identification: Callsign: NOTC; Hull number: DD-970
- Motto: Vision, Victory, Valor
- Fate: Accidentally sunk during testing, 4 December 2002.
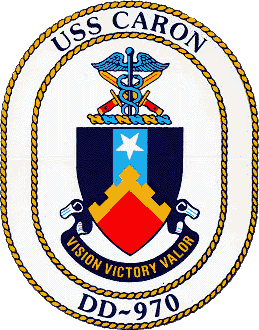
- Badge

General characteristics
- Class & type: Spruance-class destroyer
- Displacement: 8,040 long tons (8,170 t) full load
- Length: 529 ft (161 m) waterline; 563 ft (172 m) overall
- Beam: 55 ft (17 m)
- Draft: 29 ft (8.8 m)
- Installed power: 3 × 501-K17 generator sets (2,000 kW (2,700 hp) each)
- Propulsion: 4 × General Electric LM2500 gas turbines, 2 shafts, 80,000 shp (60 MW)
- Speed: 32.5 knots (60.2 km/h; 37.4 mph)
- Range: 6,000 nmi (11,000 km; 6,900 mi) at 20 knots (37 km/h; 23 mph)
- Complement: 19 officers, 315 enlisted
- Sensors & processing systems: AN/SPS-40 air search radar; AN/SPG-60 fire control radar; AN/SPS-55 surface search radar; AN/SPQ-9 gun fire control radar; Mark 23 TAS automatic detection and tracking radar; AN/SPS-65 missile fire control radar; AN/SQS-53 bow-mounted active sonar; AN/SQR-19 TACTAS towed array passive sonar; Naval Tactical Data System
- Electronic warfare & decoys: AN/SLQ-32 electronic warfare system; AN/SLQ-25 Nixie torpedo countermeasures; Mark 36 SRBOC decoy launching system; AN/SLQ-49 inflatable decoys
- Armament: 2 × 5 in (127 mm) 54 caliber Mark 45 dual purpose guns; 2 × 20 mm Phalanx CIWS Mark 15 guns; 1 × 8 cell ASROC launcher (removed); 1 × 8 cell NATO Sea Sparrow Mark 29 missile launcher; 2 × quadruple Harpoon missile canisters; 2 × Mark 32 triple 12.75 in (324 mm) torpedo tubes (Mk 46 torpedoes); 1 × 61 cell Mk 41 VLS launcher for Tomahawk missiles
- Aircraft carried: 2 × Sikorsky SH-60 Seahawk LAMPS III helicopters
- Aviation facilities: Flight deck and enclosed hangar for up to two medium-lift helicopters

USS Caron (DD-970) was a Spruance-class destroyer, named for Hospital Corpsman Third Class Wayne M. Caron (1946–1968), who was killed in action during the Vietnam War, and posthumously awarded the Medal of Honor.

== History ==
Caron was laid down by the Ingalls Shipbuilding Division of Litton Industries at Pascagoula, Mississippi on 1 July 1974. She was commissioned on 1 October 1977.

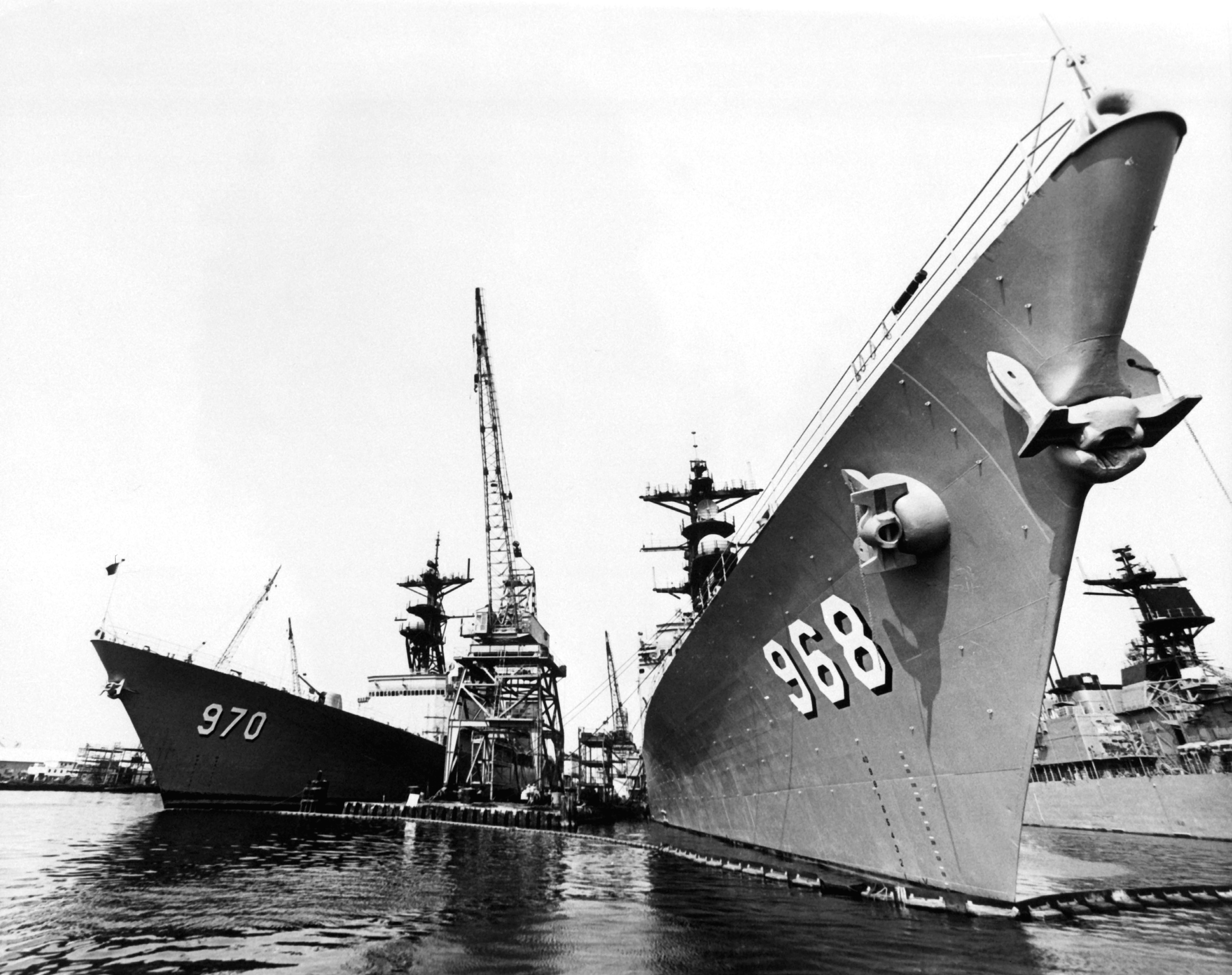
USS Caron and USS Arthur W. Radford on 1 May 1982

In August 1979 Soviet planes staged a mock missile attack against the Caron in the Black Sea.

In late October, 1983 the Caron participated in Operation Urgent Fury in the vicinity of Grenada. Near H-hour on D-Day, 25 Oct. 1983, the Caron recovered a 20-man Navy SEAL/Air Force reconnaissance team from waters off the island's southwest coast. The recon team had sortied from the USS Clifton Sprague to assess the condition of a 9,000-foot (2,700 m) runway then under construction by Cuban workers at Point Salines. Heavy swells swamped the engines of the team's small boats before they could reach shore. The Caron spotted them drifting offshore as dawn approached. Much later that day, the Caron recovered 10 more SEALs from the waters northwest of the island's capital after another commando team was driven off a radio transmitter site by a Grenadian counter-attack. The next afternoon, the Caron made yet a third recovery. The destroyer took aboard 11 Army Rangers on a raft who had been left behind on Grand Anse Beach following the successful helicopter rescue of 233 medical students and staff from St. George's University School of Medicine's beachfront campus.

From November 1983 to March 1984 Caron was part of the Multi National Peacekeeping Force in Beirut, Lebanon.

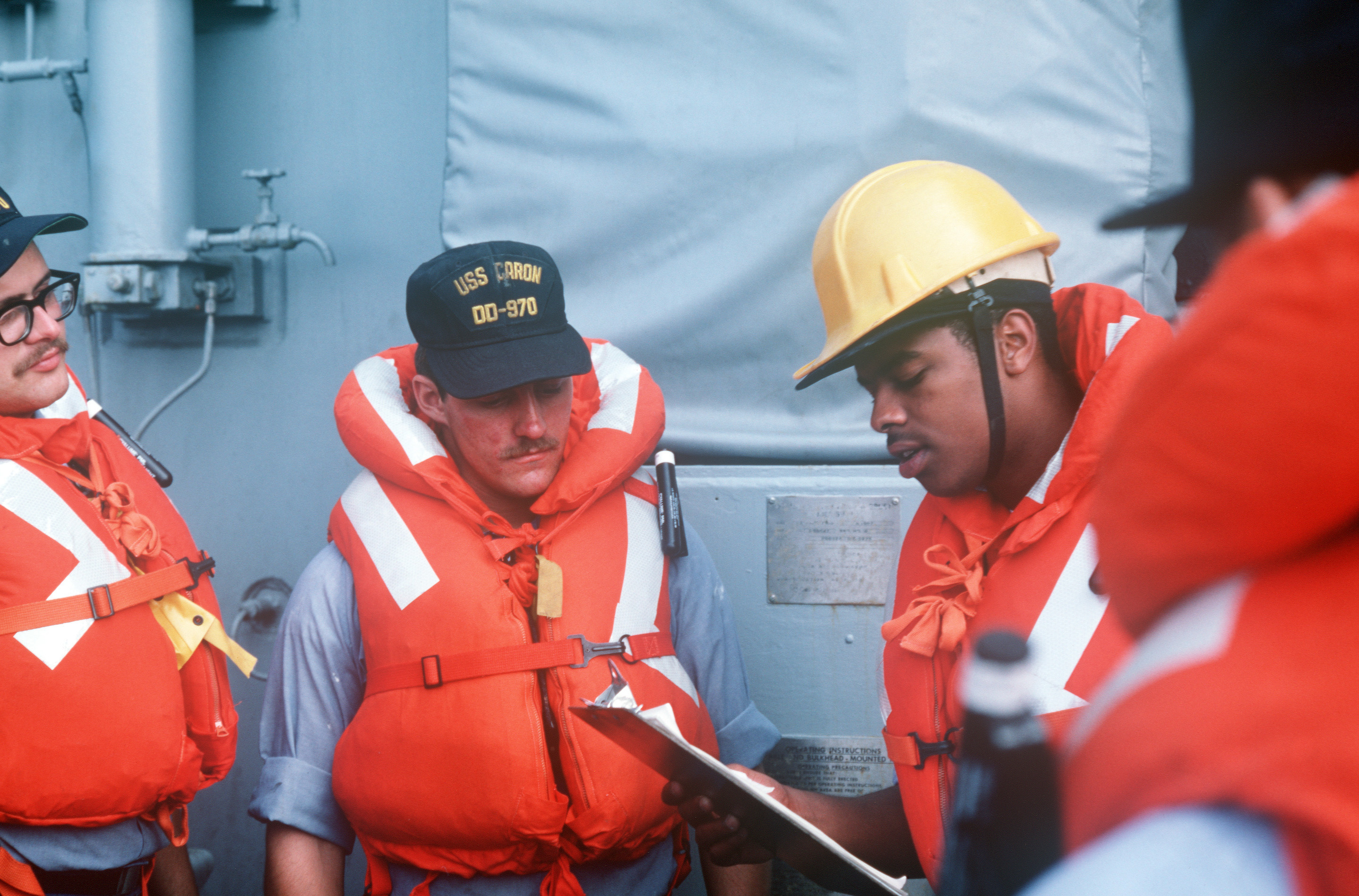
USS Caron's crewmen at work on 1 July 1986

On 10 March 1986, Caron departed Norfolk, Virginia with the America carrier battle group, for a Mediterranean deployment. During this deployment, the Action in the Gulf of Sidra took place during a freedom of navigation exercise in the Gulf of Sidra. This action saw U.S. Navy fighter aircraft shoot two Libyan Air Force fighters down. On 23 March 1986, operating with Ticonderoga and Scott, Caron moved south of the Libya–claimed "Line of Death". Libya reacted with two days of low intensity conflict in which Caron did not fire any weapons.

On 12 February 1988 Caron was lightly rammed by Soviet Mirka II class light frigate (FFL 824) in the Black Sea.

On 15 February 1990 Caron completed a regular overhaul.

Caron was deployed to the Middle East after the Iraqi invasion of Kuwait in 1990, and from 14 January 1991 she participated in Operation Desert Storm.

On 14 October 1993 she began participation in United Nations-mandated, U.S.-executed sanctions enforcement operations against Haiti. She was one of six US Navy ships prepositioned off Haiti as a result of an order by President Bill Clinton. Clinton's order allowed the ships to be in position to enforce United Nations sanctions fully on the date at which they went into effect.

In April 1995 Caron took part in a NATO mine countermeasures exercise off Denmark.

From January to July 1996 she deployed to the Persian Gulf upholding United Nations sanctions against Iraq and aiding in Operation Southern Watch.

From February to 3 July 1998 she deployed to the Mediterranean and Persian Gulf, operating with John C. Stennis and Carrier Group Seven. During this deployment, Helicopter Antisubmarine Squadron Light 46 (HSL-46) Detachment 3 maintained 2 SH-60B Seahawk onboard Caron. One of the first exercises during this deployment was Exercise Shark Hunt 98 in April 1998 off the coast of Spain.

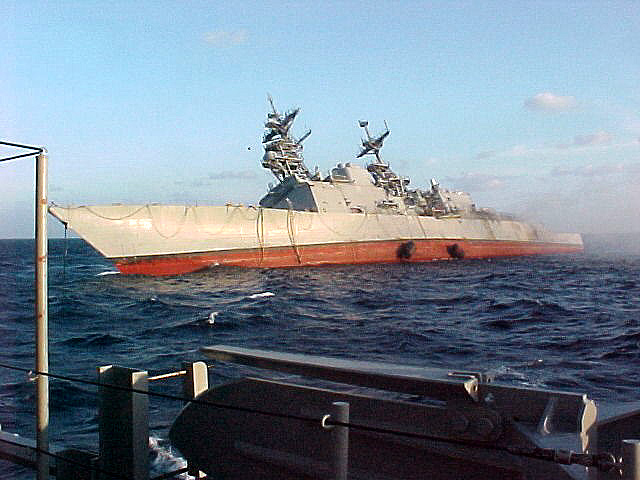
USS Caron sinking off Puerto Rico

From January to 4 June 1999 she completed a regular overhaul at Newport News Shipbuilding. This overhaul included modifications to accommodate female crew. In June to December 2000 she deployed to the Mediterranean Sea and Persian Gulf, operating with the George Washington battle group.

On 15 October 2001 the ship was decommissioned.

Caron was to be used for explosives testing off the coast of Puerto Rico prior to a SINKEX, but on 4 December 2002 the explosives test unintentionally sunk the ship.

=== Incidents in Soviet waters ===
On 13 March 1986, in an unprecedented move, Caron and Yorktown entered Soviet territorial waters to the south of the Crimean Peninsula, which prompted a Soviet diplomatic protest. Administration officials claimed it was "simply an exercise of the right of innocent passage", although Pentagon officials readily confirmed that one purpose of the exercise was to collect intelligence.

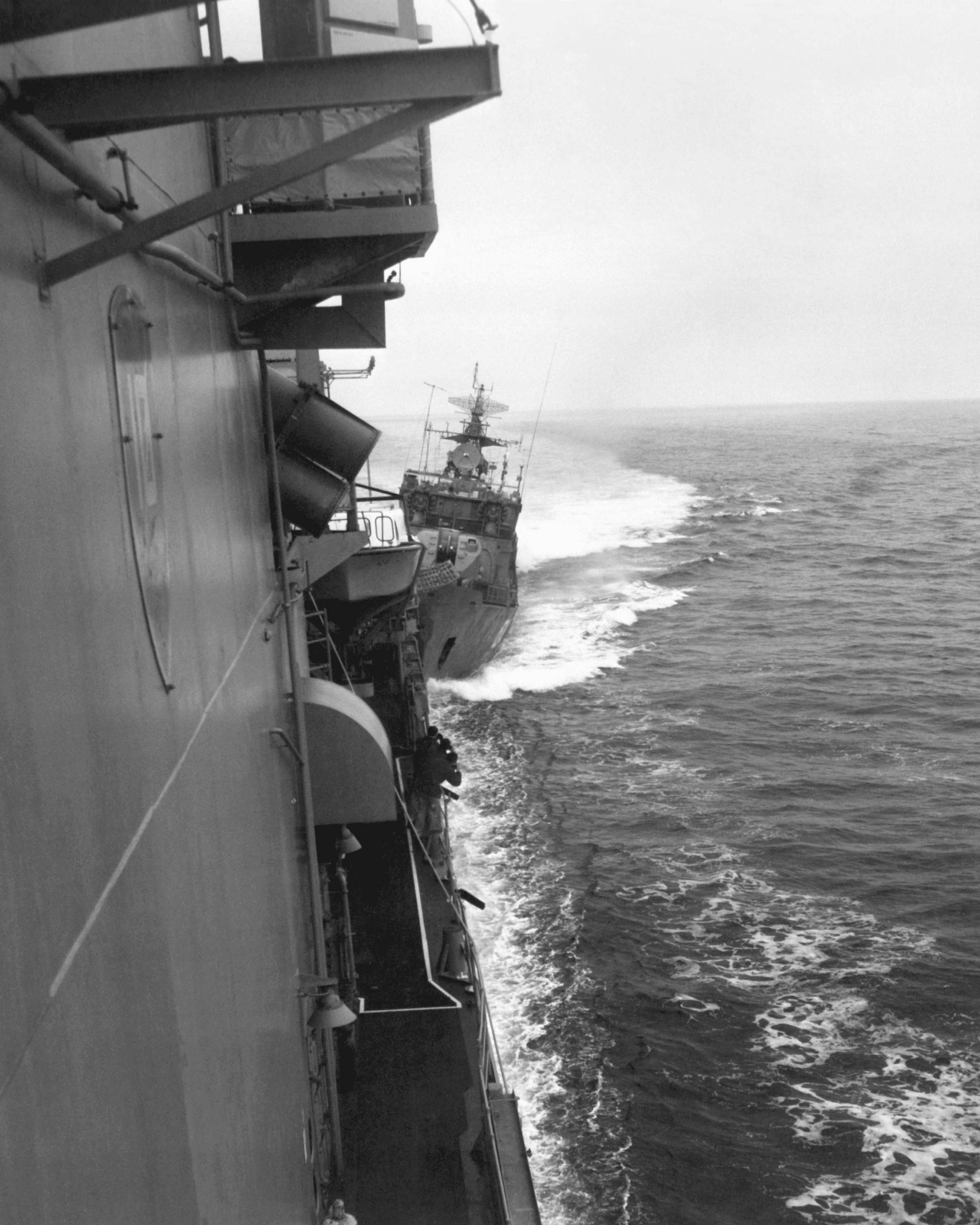
USS Caron and SKR-6 collision on 12 February 1988

In February 1988, Caron, again operating with Yorktown, entered Soviet 12 nautical miles (22 km) territorial waters limit in the Black Sea off the Crimean Peninsula. Under international law, this act could be permissible if the ship was progressing from one point in international waters to another point in international waters via the shortest course possible, but according to the Soviet Union, it was the right of the USSR to authorize or prohibit travel in selected areas within the 12-mile limit. The United States, however, did not recognize the Soviet claim in this case. To prevent the claim from becoming accepted precedent, the US Navy asserted that it had sailed warships through such areas at regular intervals in the past in accordance with established international law.

In response, the Soviets deployed a frigate "Bezzavetnyy" (rus.: "Беззаветный", Burevestnik M-class frigate) and a SKR-6 (rus.: CКР-6) Mirka II class light frigate as well as many other Soviet Navy, Coast Guard, KGB and "civilian" ships to intercept the U.S. ships. Soviet aircraft continuously buzzed the Caron and Yorktown as smaller vessels weaved to and fro in front of the American ships. Several times, Soviet vessels and aircraft obtained radar "lock" on the Caron and Yorktown. Both American ships maintained a constant course and speed throughout the incident. Eventually, the Soviets lightly rammed both ships. After the collision, and the threat of the use of weapons and aircraft by both sides, the American ships left the territorial waters of the Soviet Union. No significant damage resulted to any of the ships involved. Yorktown was under repair for three months.

== Ship's crest ==
The design of the shield and crest of the coat of arms is based on service of Wayne Maurice Caron, Hospital Corpsman Third Class, United States Navy, who heroically sacrificed his life on 28 July 1968 while aiding wounded Marines on the field of fire in Vietnam. The Medal of Honor was awarded him posthumously. Caron is named in his honor.

The light blue center section and the white five-pointed star allude to the Medal of Honor ribbon; the star is also inverted in reference to the silhouette of the Medal of Honor pendant. The one light blue and the two Navy blue sections refer to the courage, steadfast determination and selfless dedication of Petty Officer Caron in performance of duty while serving as Platoon Corpsman with Company K, Third Battalion, Seventh Marines, 1st Marine Division. The sweep of his unit through an open rice field in Quảng Nam Province is indicated by the scarlet base and the embattled gold chevron. Navy blue and gold and scarlet and gold are the colors of the Navy and Marine Corps.

The Navy-blue caduceus is the insignia worn on white uniforms by Hospital Corpsmen, United States Navy. This insignia and the crossed bayonets (in the colors of the Marine Corps) allude to the medical services customarily provided to the Marine Corps by the Navy. In particular, the caduceus and bayonets symbolize the combat operation in which Petty Officer Caron, though grievously wounded, was killed while giving medical assistance to his wounded comrades.

== Gallery ==
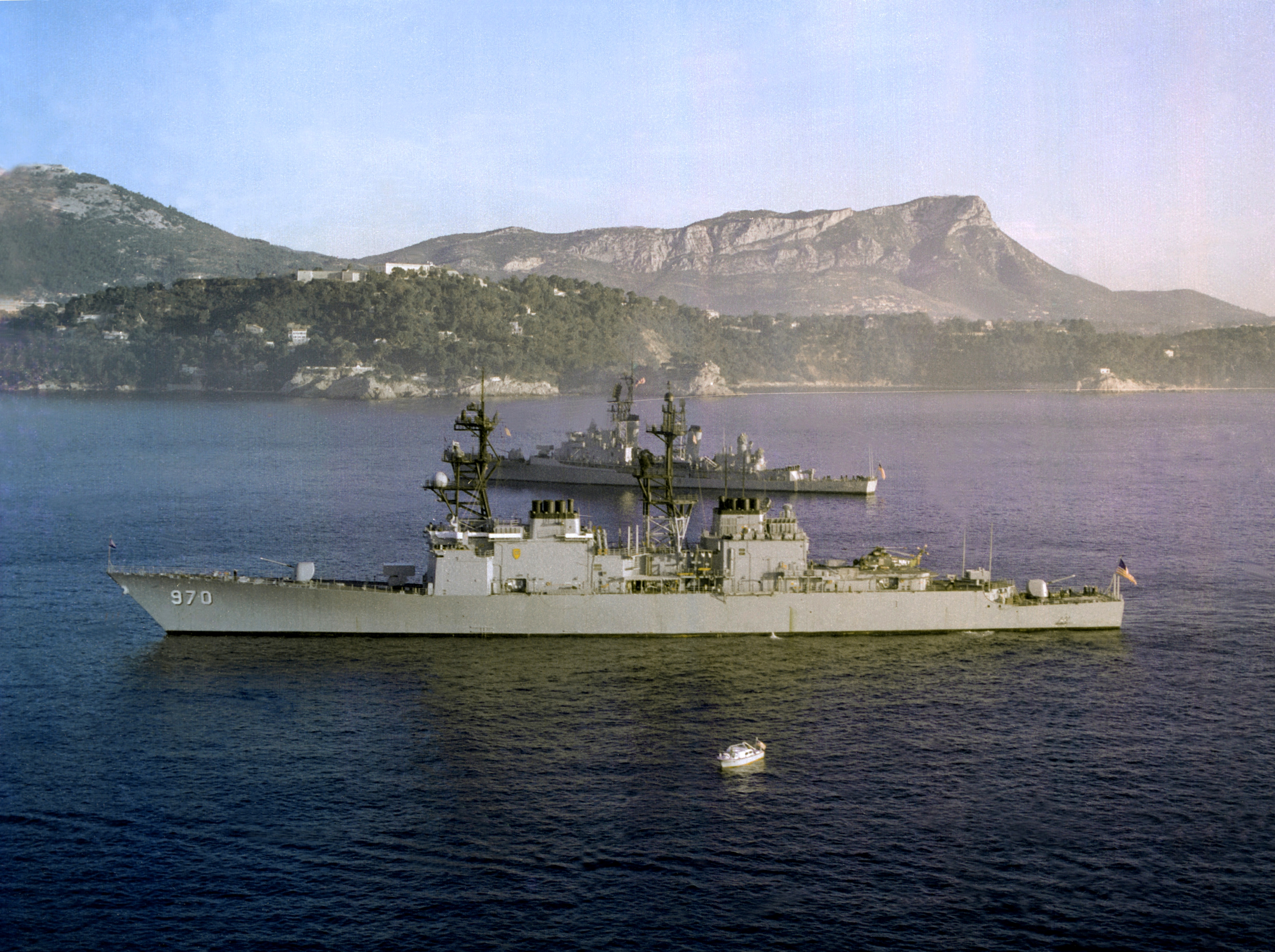
USS Caron and USS Mahan on 12 November 1979

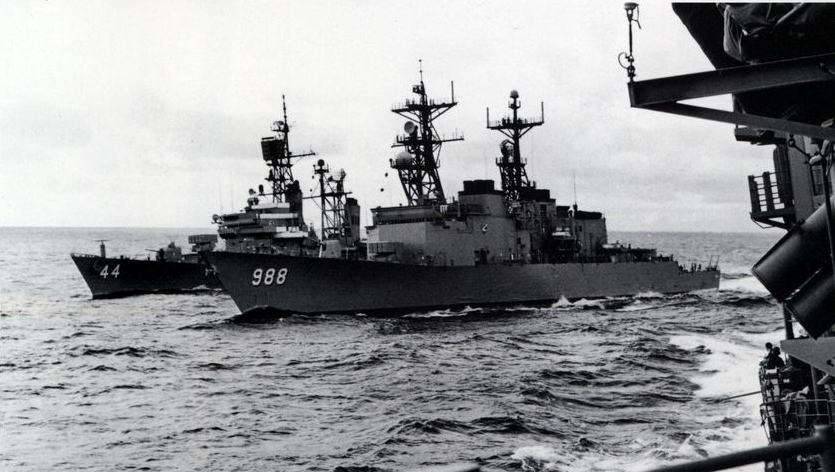
USS Caron and USS Thorn in the Atlantic Ocean in 1981

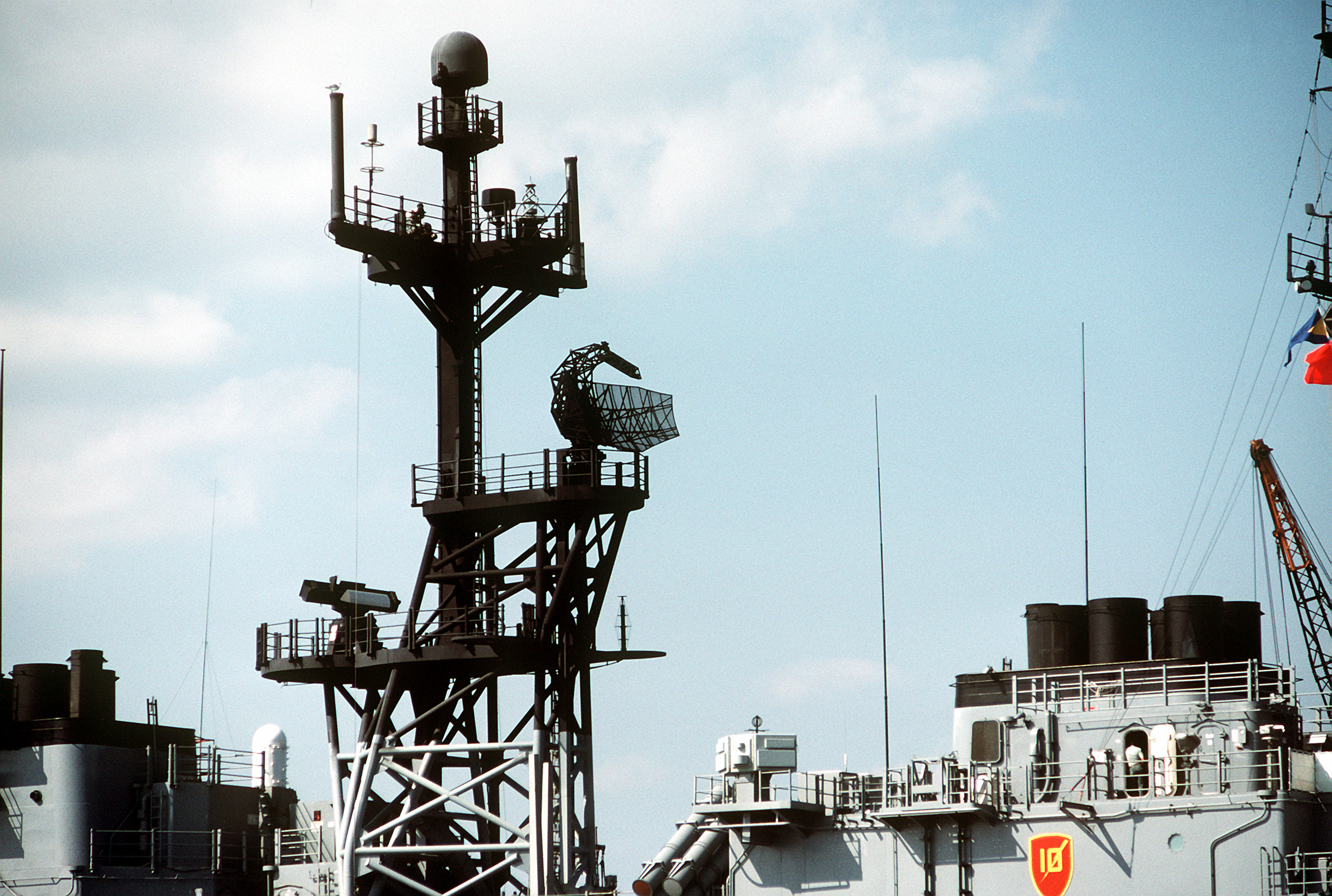
USS Caron's aft mast in 1983

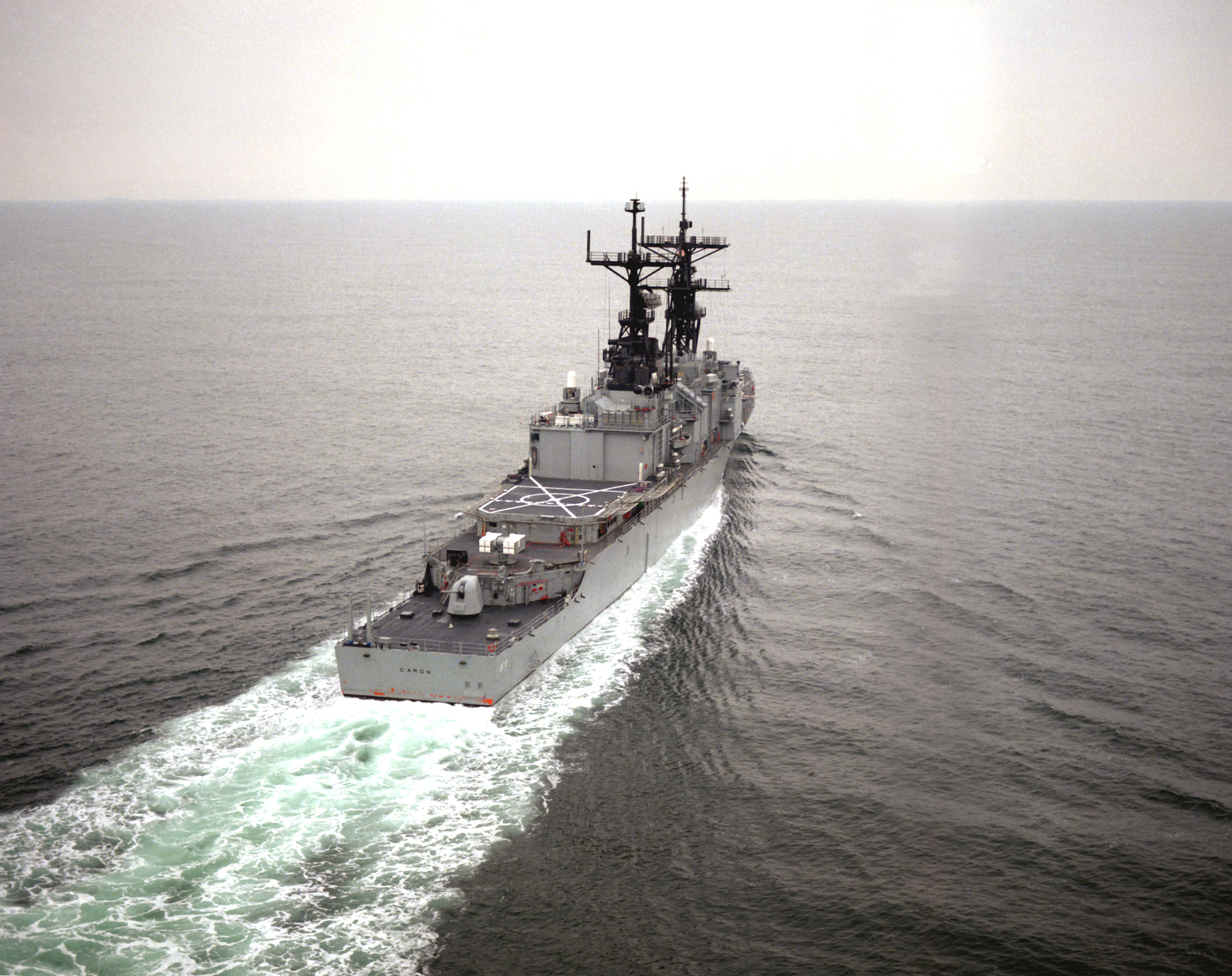
USS Caron on 21 January 1987
