= USS Huron (1861) =

Gunboat of the United States Navy

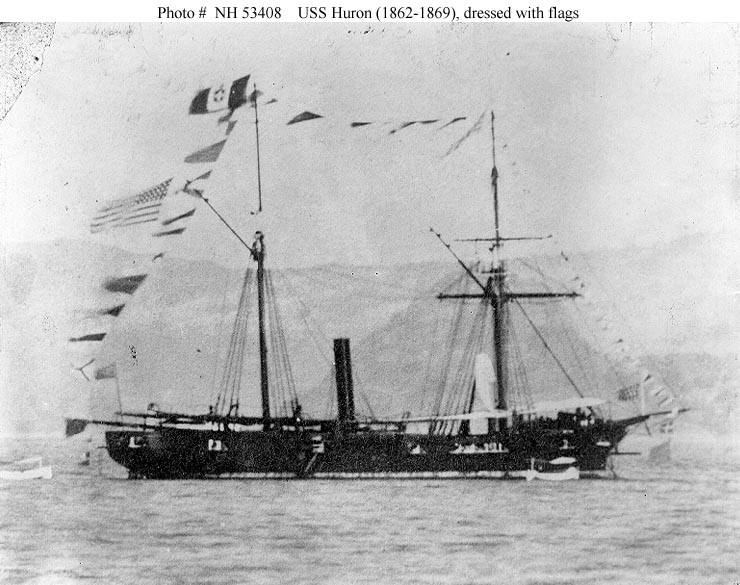
- USS Huron

History

United States
- Name: USS Huron
- Namesake: Lake Huron
- Launched: 21 Sep 1861
- Commissioned: 8 Jan 1862
- Decommissioned: Oct 1868
- Renamed: D.H. Bills
- Stricken: 1869 (est.)
- Fate: Sold, 14 June 1869

General characteristics
- Class & type: Unadilla-class gunboat
- Displacement: 691 tons
- Tons burthen: 507
- Length: 158 ft (48 m) (waterline)
- Beam: 28 ft (8.5 m)
- Draft: 9 ft 6 in (2.90 m) (max.)
- Depth of hold: 12 ft (3.7 m)
- Propulsion: 2 × 200 IHP 30-in bore by 18 in stroke horizontal back-acting engines; single screw
- Sail plan: Two-masted schooner
- Speed: 10 kn (11.5 mph)
- Complement: 114
- Armament: Original: 1 × 11-in Dahlgren smoothbore; 2 × 24-pdr smoothbore; 2 × 20-pdr Parrott rifle

USS Huron was a Unadilla-class gunboat built for the United States Navy during the American Civil War for blockade duty against the ports and rivers of the Confederate States of America.

Huron, a schooner-rigged screw steamer, was launched on 21 September 1861 by Paul Curtis, Boston, Massachusetts, under Navy contract; and commissioned on 8 January 1862 at Boston Navy Yard, Lieutenant John Downes in command.

== Service in the American Civil War ==
Huron joined the South Atlantic Blockading Squadron in February to take part in Union strangulation of Confederate commerce, and steamed off the coasts of Georgia and Florida. In addition to blockading duties, her men often took part in shore expeditions against the Confederates, as on 15 March 1862 on the Georgia coast.

=== Huron captures blockade runners Glide, Albert, and Cumbria ===
Huron chased a schooner ashore on 12 April and seven days later captured schooner Glide off Charleston, South Carolina with 100 bales of cotton and other cargo. She also captured schooner Albert on 1 May and British blockade runner Cumbria on 26 May.

=== Engaging the guns of Fort McAllister ===
As Union naval power increased the pressure on Charleston in coordination with the Union Army, Huron engaged batteries in the Stono River on 30 May and took part in an engagement with Fort McAllister on 29 July. Back on regular blockade duty, she captured schooner Aquilla on 4 August.

Huron continued her patrol and blockading duties off Charleston into 1863. During the ironclad attack on the forts in Charleston Harbor on 7 April 1863, the ship formed part of a reserve squadron outside the bar.

=== Destroying the blockade runner Stonewall Jackson ===
Five days later, while patrolling with Flag, she detected blockade runner Stonewall Jackson attempting to dash into Charleston. The two Union ships opened fire immediately, so damaging the blockade runner that she was forced to run aground and destroy her cargo, which included vitally needed Army artillery and shoes.

=== Participating in the seize of Fort Fisher ===
The veteran blockader made two more captures in December 1863-January 1864, and later in 1864 moved north to join the North Atlantic Blockading Squadron, whose main attention was turned to Wilmington, North Carolina, and its powerful defender, Fort Fisher.

During the first attack on the fort on 24–25 December 1864, Huron took part in the bombardment which was to cover the storming by Union Army troops. This first assault aborted, but preparations were quickly made for a second joint operation in January 1865.

=== The capture of Fort Fisher ===
Again, Huron provided a part of the devastating naval bombardment; and, with the help of a landing party of 2,000 sailors and marines, the Union Army assault forces captured Fort Fisher on 15 January 1865, effectually closing Wilmington to blockade runners. Then, during the final months of the war, Huron took part in combined operations against the city itself, bombarding Forts Anderson, and St. Philip in February.

=== Searching for officials of the Confederacy ===
After Appomattox, responding to the attempted escape of President Jefferson Davis of the Confederate States, Huron steamed to Key West, Florida, in an effort to capture Confederate officials bound for Havana, Cuba, or Mexico by water. She arrived on 2 May, but Davis was captured near Irwinville, Georgia on 10 May.

== After the war ==
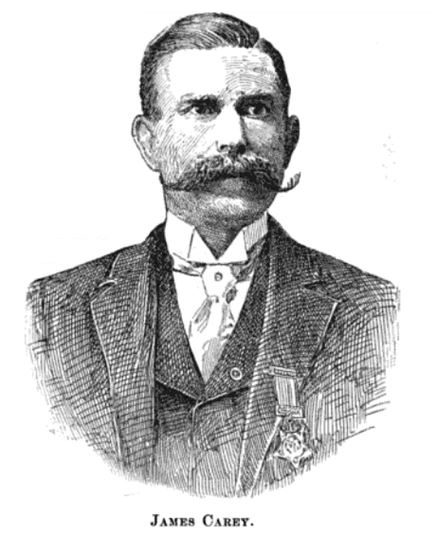
James Carey, Seaman on the Huron, saved 3 shipmates from drowning and was awarded the Medal of Honor

Following the end of the Civil War, Huron served on the South American station. Seaman James Carey, while serving on the Huron in 1868, saved three shipmates from drowning and was awarded the Medal of Honor.

She decommissioned in October 1868 and was sold in June 1869. She subsequently became the merchant vessel D.H. Bills.
