= James J. Reynolds (educator) =

Assistant superintendent in NYC schools

- Born: April 24, 1874; New York, N.Y., U.S.
- Died: May 26, 1945 (aged 71); Brooklyn, N.Y., U.S.
- Resting place: Holy Cross Cemetery
- Education: City College of New York (AB); Columbia University (MS); New York University School of Law (JD)
- Occupations: teacher, educator, lawyer
- Years active: 1894-1944
- Organization: New York City Board of Education
- Spouses: Katherine Mahoney; Margaret Irene Dailey
- Children: Quentin, James Jr., Donald, Marjorie, Constance

James Joseph Reynolds (April 24, 1874 – May 26, 1945) was a teacher, educator, and assistant superintendent of schools in New York City.

== Early life and education ==
Reynolds was born on the Lower East Side of Manhattan. He attended New York City public schools, received a bachelor's degree from the City College of New York in 1894, a master's degree from Columbia University, and a law degree from New York University School of Law.

== Career ==
To put himself through law school, Reynolds taught in the evenings after his own classes were finished, and as a result, became interested in education. Instead of becoming a practicing lawyer, he became a public school teacher in The Bronx. After several years was appointed principal of P.S. 122 in Brooklyn, becoming the youngest principal in the New York City school system at that time. He then was appointed as a district superintendent successively in Staten Island and Flatbush (Brooklyn), and later was made an assistant superintendent of schools in Bushwick (Brooklyn), a position he held until he reached the mandatory retirement age of 70 in 1944.

Reynolds made visits to Germany in 1933 and to Japan in 1940. Upon his return from both those trips, he warned that officials in those countries were planning programs of hate toward the United States.

He was also active in educational societies, was chairman of the Brooklyn Teachers Association and president of the Municipal Club of Brooklyn, and authored several textbooks on history, English, and mathematics.

== Personal life ==
Reynolds had five children, Quentin, James Jr., Donald, Marjorie, and Constance, with his first wife, the former Katherine Mahoney, who was a sister of Jeremiah T. Mahoney. She died in 1939. He then married Margaret Irene Dailey, a fellow educator and school principal, in 1942.

Reynolds died of a heart attack at his home in Brooklyn, and was buried in nearby Holy Cross Cemetery.

== Legacy ==
James J. Reynolds Junior High School in Brooklyn was named after him when it opened in 1965. The name has been retired and the school is now known as the Bay Academy and as Intermediate School 98.
