= Michael Connolly (Medal of Honor) =

United States Navy sailor

- Born: 1855; Boston, Massachusetts, US
- Died: Unknown
- Military career
- Allegiance: United States
- Branch: United States Navy
- Rank: Ordinary Seaman
- Unit: USS Plymouth
- Awards: Medal of Honor

Michael Connolly (born 1855, date of death unknown) was a United States Navy sailor and a recipient of the United States military's highest decoration, the Medal of Honor.

== Biography ==
Born in 1855 in Boston, Massachusetts, Connolly joined the Navy from that state. By August 7, 1876, he was serving as an ordinary seaman on the USS Plymouth. On that day, while Plymouth was in Halifax Harbor, Nova Scotia, he rescued a civilian from drowning. For this action, he was awarded the Medal of Honor weeks later, on August 24. He deserted from the Navy the next month, and nothing is known from him after his desertion.

Connolly's official Medal of Honor citation reads:

On board the U.S.S. Plymouth, Halifax Harbor, Nova Scotia, 7 August 1876. Acting gallantly, Connolly succeeding in rescuing a citizen from drowning on this date.

== See also ==
- List of Medal of Honor recipients in non-combat incidents
