= James A. Stewart (Medal of Honor) =

United States Marine and Medal of Honor recipient (1838–1884)

- Navy Medal of Honor
- Born: John B. Bradley; July 14, 1838; Philadelphia, Pennsylvania
- Died: January 1, 1884 (aged 45); Philadelphia, Pennsylvania
- Burial place: Mount Moriah Cemetery; Philadelphia, Pennsylvania
- Military career
- Allegiance: United States of America
- Branch: United States Marine Corps
- Service years: 1868–1873
- Rank: Sergeant
- Unit: USS Plymouth
- Awards: Medal of Honor

James A. Stewart (born John B. Bradley, July 14, 1838 – January 1, 1884) was a United States Marine and a recipient of the United States military's highest decoration, the Medal of Honor.

== Military service ==
Born in Philadelphia, Pennsylvania, in 1839, John B. Bradley was a Civil War veteran, having served as a sergeant in Company C, 95th Pennsylvania Infantry Regiment. He lived at 814 Locust Street in Philadelphia and was a lithographer by profession. Bradley using the alias name James A. Stewart joined the Marine Corps from Washington, D.C. on April 13, 1868. By February 1, 1872, he was serving as a corporal on the USS Plymouth. On that day, while Plymouth was in the harbor of Villefranche-sur-Mer, France, Stewart jumped overboard and rescued a midshipman named Osterhaus from drowning. For this action, he was awarded the Medal of Honor eight months later, on October 10. Stewart was discharged from the Marine Corps as a sergeant on July 11, 1873.

== Medal of Honor citation ==
Rank and organization: Corporal, U.S. Marine Corps. Born: 1839, Philadelphia, Pa. Accredited to: Pennsylvania. G.O. No.: 180, 10 October 1872.

Stewart's official Medal of Honor citation reads:

Serving on board the U.S.S. Plymouth, Stewart jumped overboard in the harbor of Villefranche, France, 1 February 1872 and saved Midshipman Osterhaus from drowning.

== Death and burial ==
Medal of Honor recipient James A. Stewart true name John B. Bradley died on January 1, 1884, of pneumonia and was initially interred at Machpelah Vault, Philadelphia, Pennsylvania on January 3, 1884. His remains were removed to Mount Moriah Cemetery, Philadelphia, Pennsylvania on May 10, 1884. Burial plot: Section 104, lot 24, grave W ½ 2nd from S.W. Corner.

Bradley's death notice in the January 3, 1884 Philadelphia Inquirer newspaper read:

BRADLEY. – On the 1st inst, JOHN B BRADLEY, in the forty sixth year of his age. The relatives and friends of the family, members of the Good Intent Hose Company, Lodge No. 2, B and P O Elks; Washington Brotherhood and Volunteer Firemen Association, are respectfully invited to attend the funeral, from his late residence, No. 1221 S. Thirteenth street, this afternoon, at 2 o’clock. Interment at Machpelah Vault.

Stewart / Bradley's Medal of Honor was inherited by Bradley's daughter Elizabeth Bradley. Elizabeth married Washington Russell O’Neill whom she predeceased. When Washington Russell O’Neill died on June 13, 1935, in Steubenville, Ohio he bequeathed Stewart / Bradley's Medal of Honor to their daughter Madeline O’Neill Goller in his Last Will and Testament.

== See also ==
- List of Medal of Honor recipients during peacetime
