= Timothy Donoghue =

- Born: March 17, 1825; Ireland
- Died: March 19, 1908 (aged 83); Brooklyn, New York, US
- Burial place: Holy Cross Cemetery
- Military career
- Allegiance: United States of America
- Branch: United States Army
- Rank: Sergeant
- Unit: (New York (state)) 69th New York Infantry - Company B,
- Conflicts: Battle of Fredericksburg
- Awards: Medal of Honor

Timothy Donoghue (March 17, 1825 – March 19, 1908) was an Irish soldier who fought in the American Civil War. Donoghue received the United States' highest award for bravery during combat, the Medal of Honor, for his action during the Battle of Fredericksburg in Virginia on December 13, 1862. He was honored with the award on January 17, 1894.

== Biography ==
Donoghue was born in Ireland on March 17, 1825. He joined the 69th New York Infantry from New York City in September 1862. He was promoted to Sergeant in January 1863 and transferred to the Veteran Reserve Corps in December. He died on 19 March 1908 and his remains are interred at the Holy Cross Cemetery in Brooklyn, New York.

== Medal of Honor citation ==
Voluntarily carried a wounded officer off the field from between the lines; while doing this he was himself wounded.

== See also ==
- List of American Civil War Medal of Honor recipients: A–F
