= USS Catskill (1862) =

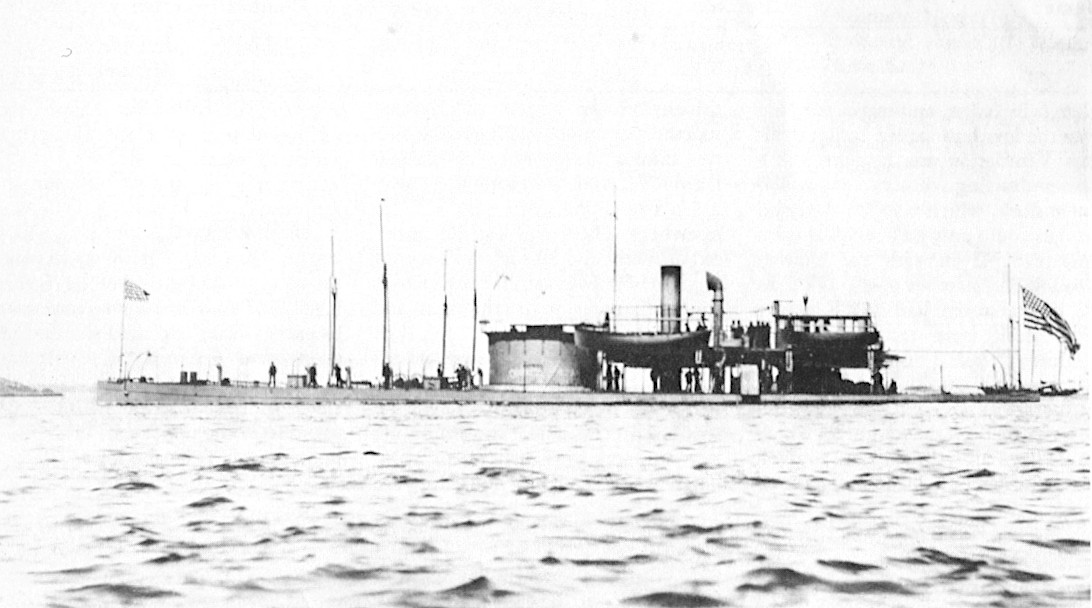
- USS Catskill in 1898 while on coastal defense duty during the Spanish–American War

History

United States
- Name: USS Catskill
- Namesake: Catskill Mountains in New York
- Builder: Continental Iron Works (Greenpoint, NY)
- Laid down: 1862
- Launched: December 16, 1862
- Commissioned: February 24, 1863
- Decommissioned: September 22, 1898
- Renamed: USS Goliath, June 15, 1869; USS Catskill, August 10, 1869
- Fate: Sold, December 4, 1901

General characteristics
- Class & type: Passaic-class ironclad monitor
- Displacement: 1,335 long tons (1,356 t)
- Length: 200 ft (61 m) o/a
- Beam: 46 ft (14 m)
- Draft: 10 ft 6 in (3.20 m)
- Installed power: 320 ihp (240 kW)
- Propulsion: 1 × Ericsson vibrating lever engine; 2 × Martin boilers; 1 × shaft
- Speed: 7 kn (8.1 mph; 13 km/h)
- Complement: 87
- Armament: 1 × 15 in (380 mm) smoothbore gun; 1 × 11 in (280 mm) Dahlgren gun; 2 × 12-pounder Dahlgren deck howitzers (picket duty only)
- Armor: Side: 3–5 in (7.6–12.7 cm); Turret: 11 in (28 cm); Pilothouse: 8 in (20 cm); Deck: 1 in (2.5 cm)
- Notes: Armor is iron.

USS Catskill was a monitor built for the United States Navy during the American Civil War. She continued to serve the Navy after the war's end until decommissioned in 1898 after the end of the Spanish–American War.

== Service history ==
=== Civil War ===
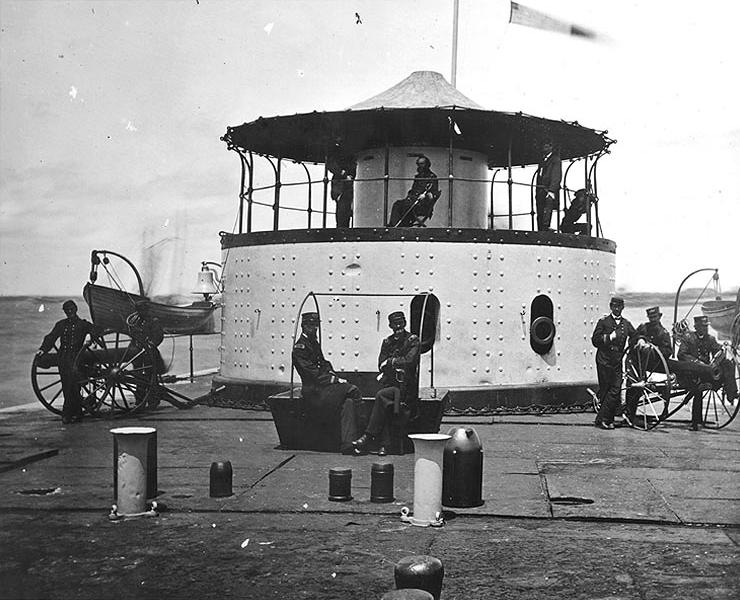
The officers of USS Catskill posing on deck and atop the turret in Charleston Harbor, South Carolina, circa 1865

USS Catskill—a single-turreted Passaic-class monitor—was launched on December 16, 1862, by Continental Iron Works, Greenpoint, New York; outfitted at New York Navy Yard; commissioned on February 24, 1863, Commander George Washington Rodgers in command; and reported to the South Atlantic Blockading Squadron.

Catskill reported for duty at Port Royal, South Carolina on March 5, 1863, and for the remainder of the war operated off Charleston, South Carolina. Catskill was damaged by Confederate gunfire during the 7 April attack on Fort Sumter that demonstrated both the strengths of well-defended fortifications and the limitations of monitor-type ironclads. That began the lengthy series of operations against the strongly fortified and stoutly defended harbor.

From July–September 1863, Catskill repeatedly took part in attacks on the batteries and forts protecting Charleston from the sea. Rodgers was killed in action on 17 August, while directing the fire of his ship against Charleston's forts. The ship was hit by Confederate gunfire on several occasions, but skillful work by her crew—now under the command of Lieutenant Commander Edward Barrett—returned her to action without returning for repairs.

Catskill destroyed the grounded blockade runner Prince Albert off Fort Moultrie on August 9, 1864. When Charleston was evacuated on 18 February 1865, she boarded and took possession of the grounded blockade runner, Deer, and later in that day raised the flag over another grounded steamer, Celt.

=== Later career ===
Relieved from duty, Catskill cleared Charleston on July 13, and sailed to the Philadelphia Navy Yard, where she was decommissioned on 26 July. Here she remained in ordinary until 1873. During that time, she was briefly renamed Goliath (June 15 – August 10, 1869). Repaired at New York during 1874 and 1875, Catskill joined the North Atlantic Squadron, with whom she cruised along the northeast coast from March 4, 1876 – November 5, 1877. From 1878 to 1895, Catskill was in ordinary at various anchorages in Virginia, and from 1895 to 1898 in ordinary at Philadelphia's League Island Navy Yard.

Upon the outbreak of the Spanish–American War, Catskill was recommissioned for patrol duty in New England waters. This lasted from April 16 – September 22, 1898, after which Catskill returned to League Island until sold on 4 December 1901.
