= Wayne Maurice Caron =

US Navy medical corpsman and Medal of Honor recipient (1946–1968)

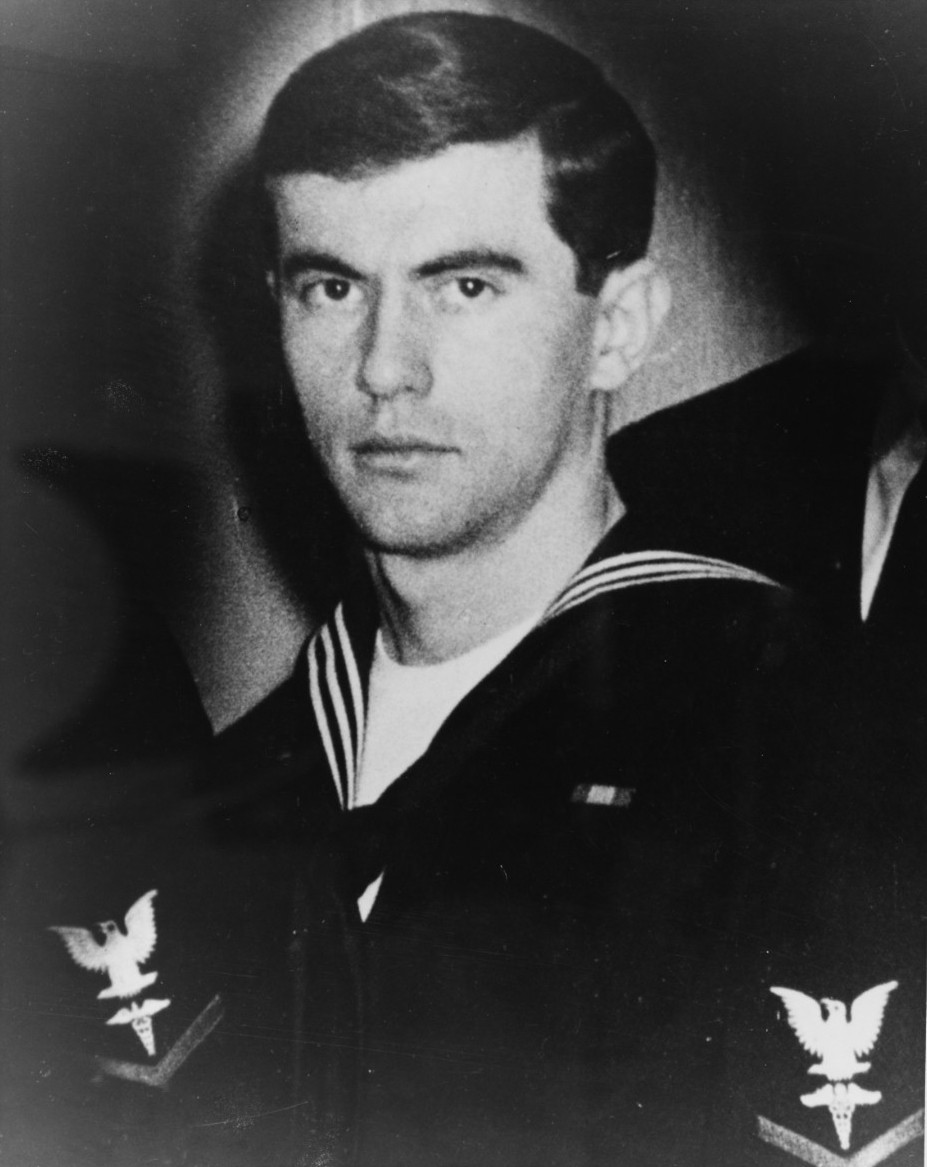
- Born: November 2, 1946; Middleboro, Massachusetts, US
- Died: July 28, 1968 (aged 21); Quảng Nam Province, Republic of Vietnam
- Burial place: Arlington National Cemetery, Arlington, Virginia
- Military career
- Allegiance: United States of America
- Branch: United States Navy
- Service years: 1966–1968
- Rank: Hospital Corpsman Third Class
- Units: K Company, 3rd Battalion, 7th Marine Regiment, 1st Marine Division
- Conflicts: Vietnam War †
- Awards: Medal of Honor; Purple Heart Medal; Combat Action Ribbon; Republic of Vietnam Military Merit Medal; Republic of Vietnam Gallantry Cross with Palm

Wayne Maurice Caron (November 2, 1946 – July 28, 1968) was a United States Navy hospital corpsman who was killed in action while serving with a Marine Corps rifle company in the Vietnam War. For heroic actions above and beyond the call of duty on July 28, 1968, he was posthumously awarded the United States military's highest decoration for valor—the Medal of Honor.

== Biography ==
Caron was born in Middleborough, Massachusetts. He graduated from Memorial High School in Middleborough in June 1966.

Caron joined the U.S. Navy on July 12, 1966, at Boston. He completed recruit training at the Great Lakes Naval Training Center and then Navy Hospital Corps School, at Great Lakes, Illinois. Caron also completed the Field Medical Service School at Camp Pendleton, California. On January 16, 1968, he was promoted to hospital corpsman third class.

On July 3, 1968, Caron was sent to and arrived in Vietnam. He was assigned to Headquarters and Service Company, 3rd Battalion, 7th Marine Regiment, 1st Marine Division (Reinforced). On July 28, Caron was killed in action during an intense firefight while serving as a platoon corpsman with K Company, 3rd Battalion, 7th Marines in Quảng Nam Province, South Vietnam. Before he was killed, Caron was wounded three separate times in the firefight by enemy fire while he moved to render aid to fallen Marines. The 3rd Battalion, 7th Marines lost 18 Marines besides Caron that day.

Caron, age 21, was buried in Arlington National Cemetery, Arlington County, Virginia.

On April 20, 1970, Caron's wife was presented his Medal of Honor by Vice President Spiro Agnew during a ceremony at the White House.

== Military awards ==
Caron's military awards and decorations include:

Medal of Honor	Purple Heart Medal	Navy Combat Action Ribbon
Navy Presidential Unit Citation	National Defense Service Medal	Vietnam Service Medal w/ FMF Combat Operation Insignia and one 3/16" bronze star
Republic of Vietnam Meritorious Unit Citation (Gallantry Cross) w/ Palm and Frame	Republic of Vietnam Meritorious Unit Citation (Civil Actions) w/ Palm and Frame	Republic of Vietnam Campaign Medal w/ 1960- device

=== Medal of Honor citation ===
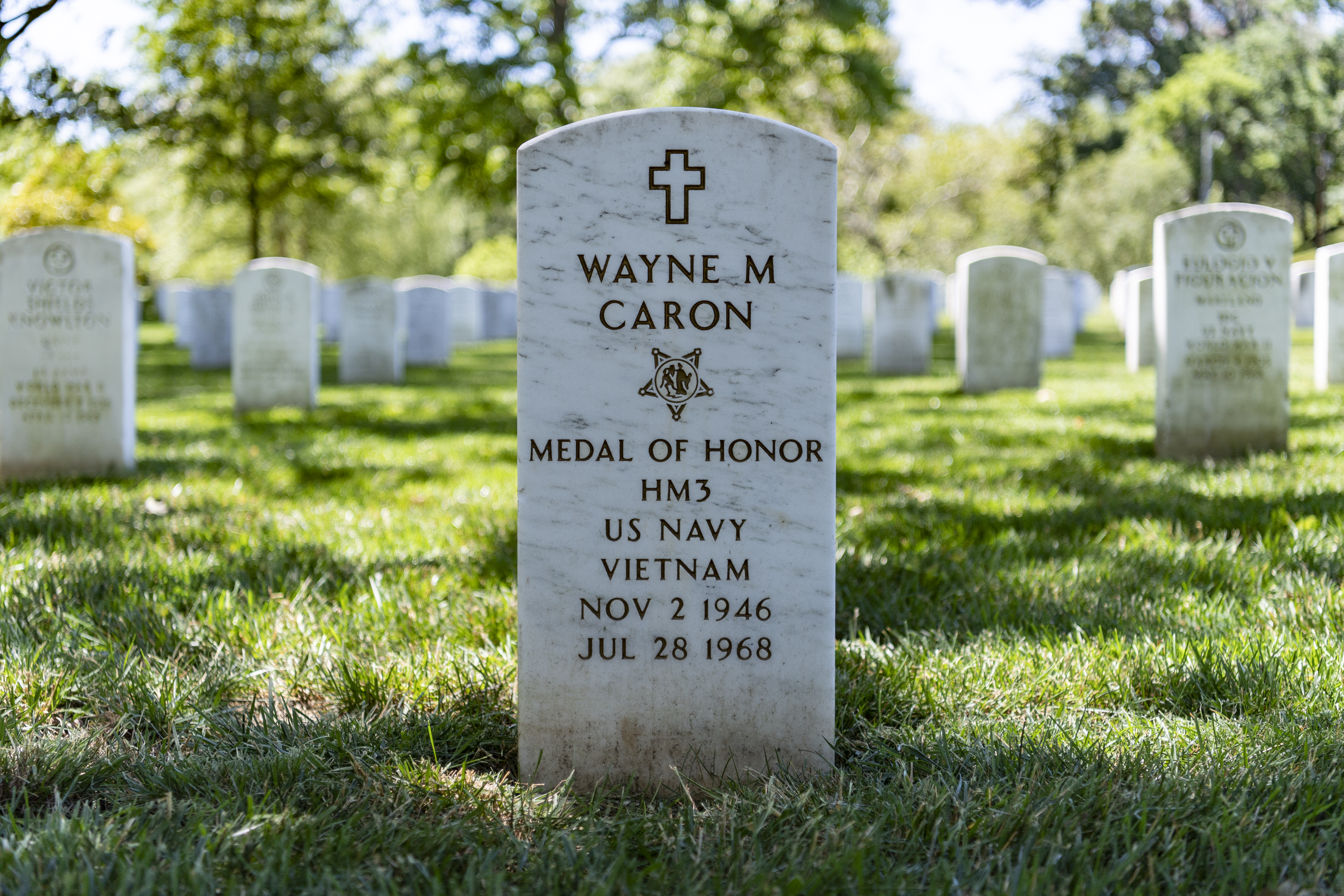
Grave at Arlington National Cemetery

Caron's official Medal of Honor citation reads:

The President of the United States in the name of The Congress takes pride in presenting the MEDAL OF HONOR posthumously to

HOSPITAL CORPSMAN THIRD CLASS WAYNE MAURICE CARON
UNITED STATES NAVY

for service as set forth in the following

CITATION:

For conspicuous gallantry and intrepidity at the risk of his life above and beyond the call of duty while serving as platoon corpsman with Company K, during combat operations against enemy forces. While on a sweep through an open rice field HM3 Caron's unit started receiving enemy small arms fire. Upon seeing two Marine casualties fall, he immediately ran forward to render first aid, but found that they were dead. At this time, the platoon was taken under intense small-arms and automatic weapons fire, sustaining additional casualties. As he moved to the aid of his wounded comrades, HM3 Caron was hit in the arm by enemy fire. Although knocked to the ground, he regained his feet and continued to the injured Marines. He rendered medical assistance to the first Marine he reached, who was grievously wounded, and undoubtedly was instrumental in saving the man's life. HM3 Caron then ran toward the second wounded Marine, but was again hit by enemy fire, this time in the leg. Nonetheless, he crawled the remaining distance and provided medical aid for this severely wounded man. HM3 Caron started to make his way to yet another injured comrade, when he was again struck by enemy small-arms fire. Courageously and with unbelievable determination, HM3 Caron continued his attempt to reach the third Marine until he was killed by an enemy rocket round. His inspiring valor, steadfast determination and selfless dedication in the face of extreme danger, sustain and enhance the finest traditions of the U.S. Naval Service.

/S/ RICHARD M. NIXON

== Honors and namings ==
In 1970, a plaque at the Chelsea Naval Hospital was placed in Caron's honor.

On October 1, 1977, the USS Caron, a Spruance-class destroyer, was commissioned by the United States Navy. The ship was named in honor of Caron.

On June 17, 1994, a Navy medical clinic at Camp Lejeune, North Carolina, was named after Caron. This was the first building named for a corpsman at Camp Lejeune; the Navy Hospital Corps was founded on June 17, 1898.

== See also ==
- List of Medal of Honor recipients for the Vietnam War
