= Paul Tobin (Medal of Honor) =

- Born: Pleyben, France
- Military career
- Allegiance: United States of America
- Branch: United States Navy
- Rank: Landsman
- Unit: USS Plymouth
- Awards: Medal of Honor

Paul Tobin was a United States Navy sailor and a recipient of the United States military's highest decoration, the Medal of Honor.

A native of Pleyben, France, Tobin joined the U.S. Navy from Brest. By July 3, 1871, he was serving as a landsman on the USS Plymouth. On that day, while the Plymouth was at the Port of Hamburg, Germany, a small boat approached the ship in a strong current. When the boat capsized, Tobin and another sailor, Quarter Gunner George Holt, jumped overboard and rescued one of the boat's crewmen. For this action, both he and Holt were awarded the Medal of Honor a year later, on October 10, 1872.

Tobin's official Medal of Honor citation reads:

On board the U.S.S. Plymouth, Hamburg Harbor, 3 July 1871. Jumping overboard at the imminent risk of his life, Tobin, with a comrade, rescued from drowning one of a party who was thrown from a shore boat into a 4-knot running tide while the boat was coming alongside the ship.

Details of Tobin's later life and place of burial are unknown.

== See also ==
- List of Medal of Honor recipients during peacetime
