= Charles Gidding =

United States Medal of Honor recipient

Charles J. Gidding
- Born: c. 1853; Bangor, Maine
- Died: November 28, 1943 (aged 89–90)
- Burial place: Waltham, Massachusetts
- Military career
- Allegiance: United States
- Branch: United States Navy
- Rank: Seaman
- Unit: USS Plymouth
- Awards: Medal of Honor

Charles J. Gidding or Giddings (1853–1943) was a United States Navy sailor and a recipient of the United States military's highest decoration, the Medal of Honor.

== Biography ==
Born in about 1853 in Bangor, Maine, Gidding joined the Navy from that state. By July 26, 1876, he was serving as a seaman on the USS Plymouth. On that day, while Plymouth was at the Brooklyn Navy Yard, Gidding and another sailor, Landsman William Corey, attempted to rescue a crewmate Seaman named Matthew Francis who had fallen from the ship's rigging into the water. For this action, both men were awarded the Medal of Honor two weeks later, on August 9. Another of Plymouth's crew, Seaman Thomas Kersey, rescued a shipmate from drowning on the same day and also received the medal.

Gidding's official Medal of Honor citation reads:

Serving on board the U.S.S. Plymouth, Gidding showed heroic conduct in trying to save the life of one of the crew of that ship, who had fallen overboard from aloft at the Navy Yard, New York, 26 July 1876.

Gidding died on Nov 28, 1943 and is buried in Grove Hill Cemetery, Waltham, Massachusetts (Section A, Lot 13.35, Grave 1).

== See also ==
- List of Medal of Honor recipients during peacetime
