= George Holt (Medal of Honor) =

American peacetime Medal of Honor recipient (1840 – ?)

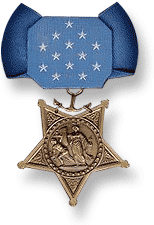
- Born: c. 1840; Louisville, Kentucky, US
- Military career
- Allegiance: United States
- Branch: United States Navy
- Rank: Quarter Gunner
- Unit: USS Plymouth
- Awards: Medal of Honor

George Holt (born c. 1840, year of death unknown) was a United States Navy sailor and a recipient of the United States military's highest decoration, the Medal of Honor.

Born in Louisville, Kentucky in about 1840, Holt later joined the Navy from that state. By July 3, 1871, he was serving as a quarter gunner on the USS Plymouth. On that day, while the Plymouth was at the Port of Hamburg, Germany, a small boat approached the ship in a strong current. When the boat capsized, Holt and another sailor, Landsman Paul Tobin, jumped overboard and rescued one of the boat's crewmen. For this action, both he and Tobin were awarded the Medal of Honor a year later, on October 10, 1872.

Holt's official Medal of Honor citation reads:

On board the U.S.S. Plymouth, Hamburg Harbor, 3 July 1871. Jumping overboard at the imminent risk of his life, Holt, with a comrade, rescued from drowning one of a party who was thrown from a shore boat into a 4-knot, running tide while the boat was coming alongside the ship.

== See also ==
- List of Medal of Honor recipients during peacetime
