= William Corey (Medal of Honor) =

United States Navy Medal of Honor recipient

- Born: 1853; New York City
- Died: Unknown
- Military career
- Allegiance: United States of America
- Branch: United States Navy
- Rank: Landsman
- Unit: USS Plymouth
- Awards: Medal of Honor

William Corey (born 1853, date of death unknown) was a United States Navy sailor and a recipient of the United States military's highest decoration, the Medal of Honor.

== Biography ==
Born in 1853 in New York, New York, Corey joined the Navy from that state. On July 26, 1876, while serving as a landsman on the USS Plymouth was at the Brooklyn Navy Yard, Corey and another sailor, Seaman Charles Gidding, attempted to rescue a crewmate Seaman named Matthew Francis who had fallen from the ship's rigging into the water. For this action, both men were awarded the Medal of Honor two weeks later, on August 9. Another of Plymouth's crew, Seaman Thomas Kersey, rescued a shipmate from drowning on the same day and also received the medal.

Corey's official Medal of Honor citation reads:

On board the U.S.S. Plymouth, Navy Yard, New York, 26 July 1876. Showing heroic conduct, William Corey endeavored to save the life of one of the crew of that ship who had fallen overboard from aloft.

== See also ==
- List of Medal of Honor recipients during peacetime
