= USS Plymouth (1867) =

Sloop-of-war of the United States Navy

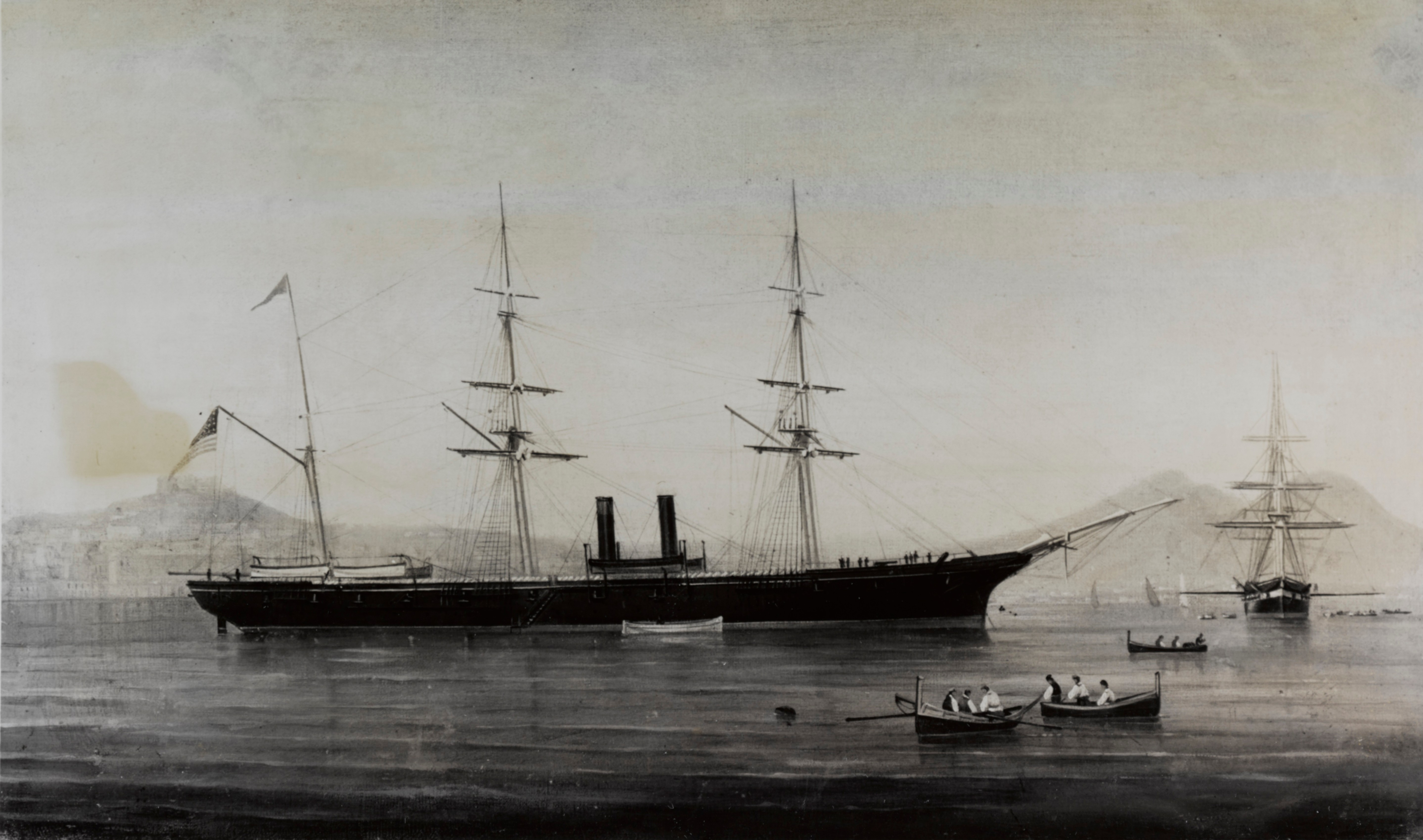

History

United States
- Name: USS Plymouth
- Laid down: 1867
- Launched: 1868
- Commissioned: 20 January 1869, as Kenosha
- Decommissioned: 17 May 1879
- Renamed: Plymouth, 15 May 1869
- Fate: Scrapped, 1884

General characteristics
- Type: Screw sloop
- Tonnage: 2400
- Length: 250 ft 6 in (76.35 m)
- Beam: 38 ft (12 m)
- Draft: 16 ft (4.9 m)
- Speed: 12 knots (22 km/h; 14 mph)
- Armament: 1 × 11 in (280 mm) smoothbore Dahlgren gun; 10 × 9 in (230 mm) smoothbore Dahlgren guns; 1 × 60-pounder (27 kg) gun; 2 × 20-pounder (9 kg) guns

USS Plymouth, a wooden-hulled screw sloop-of-war, was the second ship of the United States Navy to be named for Plymouth, Massachusetts.

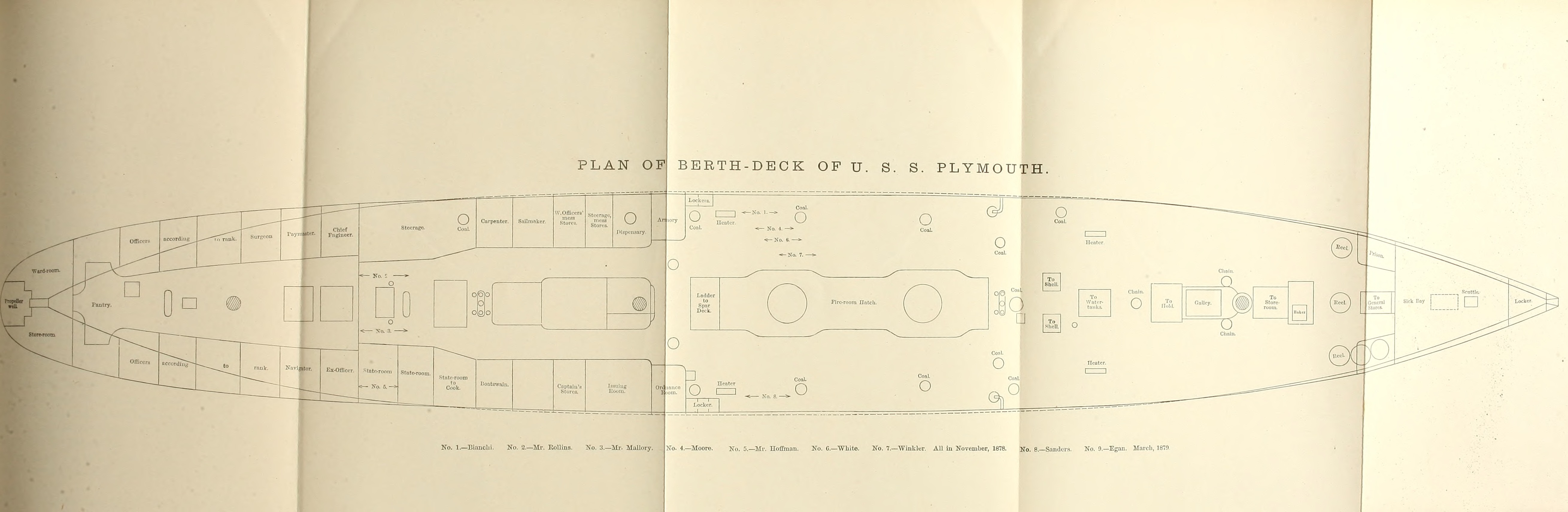
Plan of berth deck of USS Plymouth

Plymouth's keel was laid down as Kenosha at the New York Navy Yard in 1867; completed in 1868; and commissioned on 20 January 1869 with Captain William H. Macomb in command.

== Service history ==
Kenosha got underway eastward across the Atlantic on 25 February 1869. While on the European Station she was renamed Plymouth on 15 May 1869. Word of the change reached her at Ville Franche, on 26 June. She then cruised off the Levant and North Africa under her new name, returning to Marseille on 19 November. From southern France, she continued on to Portsmouth, England, whence she accompanied the British turreted battleship HMS Monarch, carrying the remains of George Peabody, American merchant, financier and philanthropist, to the United States for burial. Arriving at Portland, Maine, on 25 January 1870, she remained there on ceremonial duty until sailing for Portsmouth, New Hampshire, for refit at the navy yard.

Plymouth departed New York on 12 July 1870 and steamed to the Mediterranean Sea where Rear Admiral Charles Boggs selected her as flagship of the European Station, 21 September. During Plymouth's service in the European Station, two sailors and one marine were awarded the Medal of Honor for rescuing others from drowning: Quarter Gunner George Holt and Landsman Paul Tobin at the Port of Hamburg, Germany, on 3 July 1871 and Corporal James A. Stewart at Ville Franche, France, on 1 February 1872. The ship sailed for the coast of Africa on 17 February 1872, thence headed home via the West Indies and remained on the Atlantic coast until returning to European waters 1 November 1872. This deployment lasted until the screw sloop sailed for home 6 June 1873. She arrived at New York City on 18 June, thence proceeded to Portsmouth, New Hampshire, where she decommissioned on 28 June.

Recommissioned 10 October 1874, the sloop operated along the Atlantic coast and in the Caribbean Sea. Under the command of Captain Edward Barrett, Plymouth was sent by the Government to attend the closing of the International Expo. Barrett was also the first to test the Eads jetties in the spring of 1877.

In the spring and summer of 1876, Captain Edward Barrett nominated six of her sailors for the Medal of Honor for rescuing or attempting to rescue others from drowning: Captain of the Mizzen Top Albert Weisbogel at sea on 27 April; Seaman Emile Lejeune at Port Royal, South Carolina, on 6 June; Landsman William Corey, Seaman Charles Gidding, and Ordinary Seaman Thomas Kersey at the Brooklyn Navy Yard on 26 July; and Ordinary Seaman Michael Connolly at Halifax Harbor, Nova Scotia, on 7 August.

On the occasion of Great Railroad Strike of 1877, Captain Barrett was called to Washington, where he organized a brigade of naval sailors and marines for the protection of the city and public establishments and held the command of the first aid force until all danger had passed. Plymouth was employed sailing up the Potomac River, with Lieutenant Benjamin Tilley.

Plymouth decommissioned again 17 May 1879, and remained in ordinary at Portsmouth until scrapped in 1884.

== See also ==
- List of sloops of war of the United States Navy
- Bibliography of early American naval history
