= Holy Cross Cemetery, Brooklyn =

Cemetery in Brooklyn, New York City

Holy Cross Cemetery
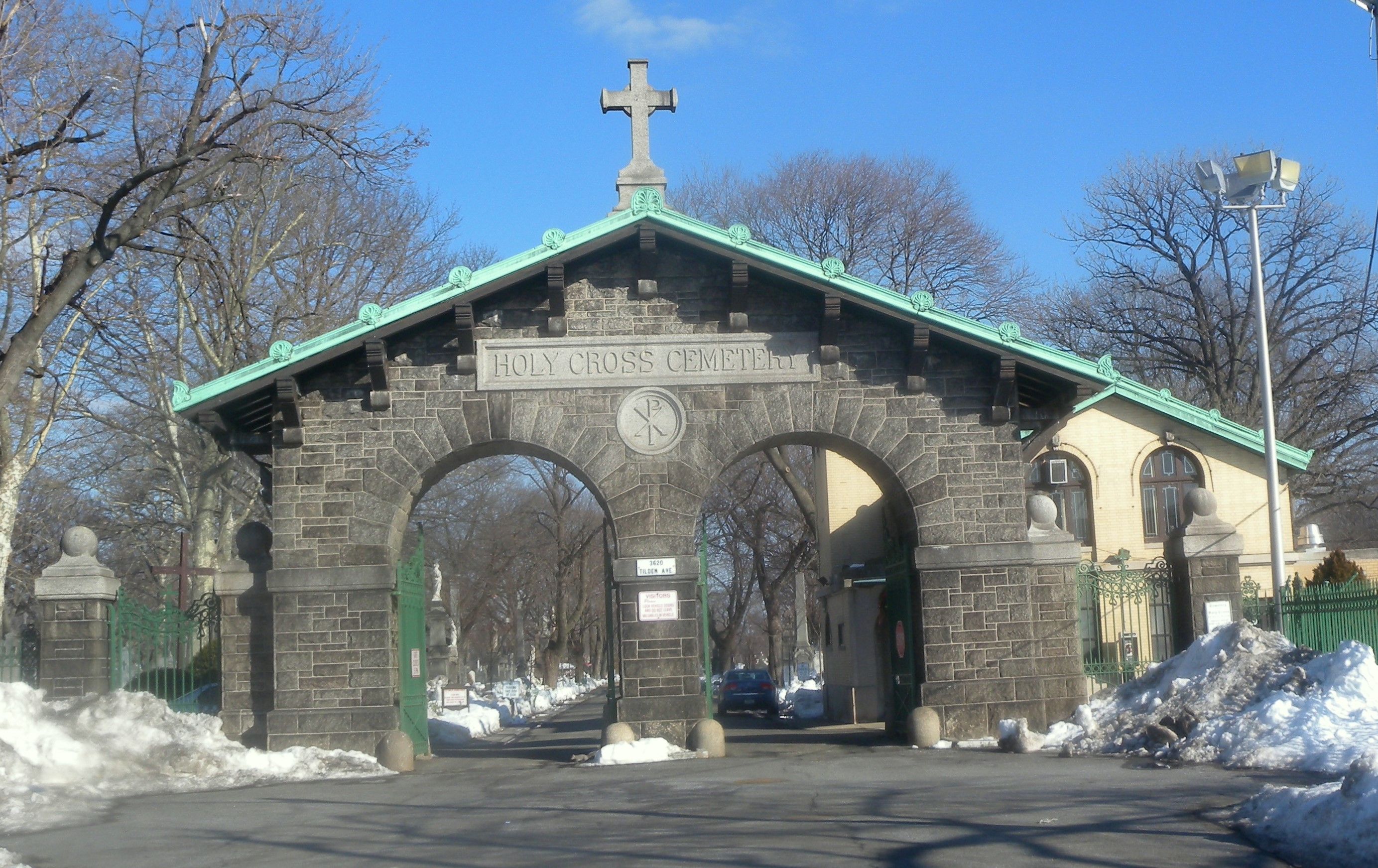
- Interactive map of Holy Cross Cemetery

Details
- Location: 3620 Tilden Avenue, East Flatbush, Brooklyn, New York City
- Country: United States
- Coordinates: 40.6465°N 73.9386°W
- Type: Catholic
- Owned by: Diocese of Brooklyn
- Website: www.ccbklyn.org/our-cemeteries/holy-cross-cemetery/
- Find a Grave: Holy Cross Cemetery

Holy Cross Cemetery, located at 3620 Tilden Avenue in East Flatbush, Brooklyn, New York City, is a Catholic cemetery operated by the Diocese of Brooklyn. The cemetery opened on July 13, 1849.

== Notable burials ==
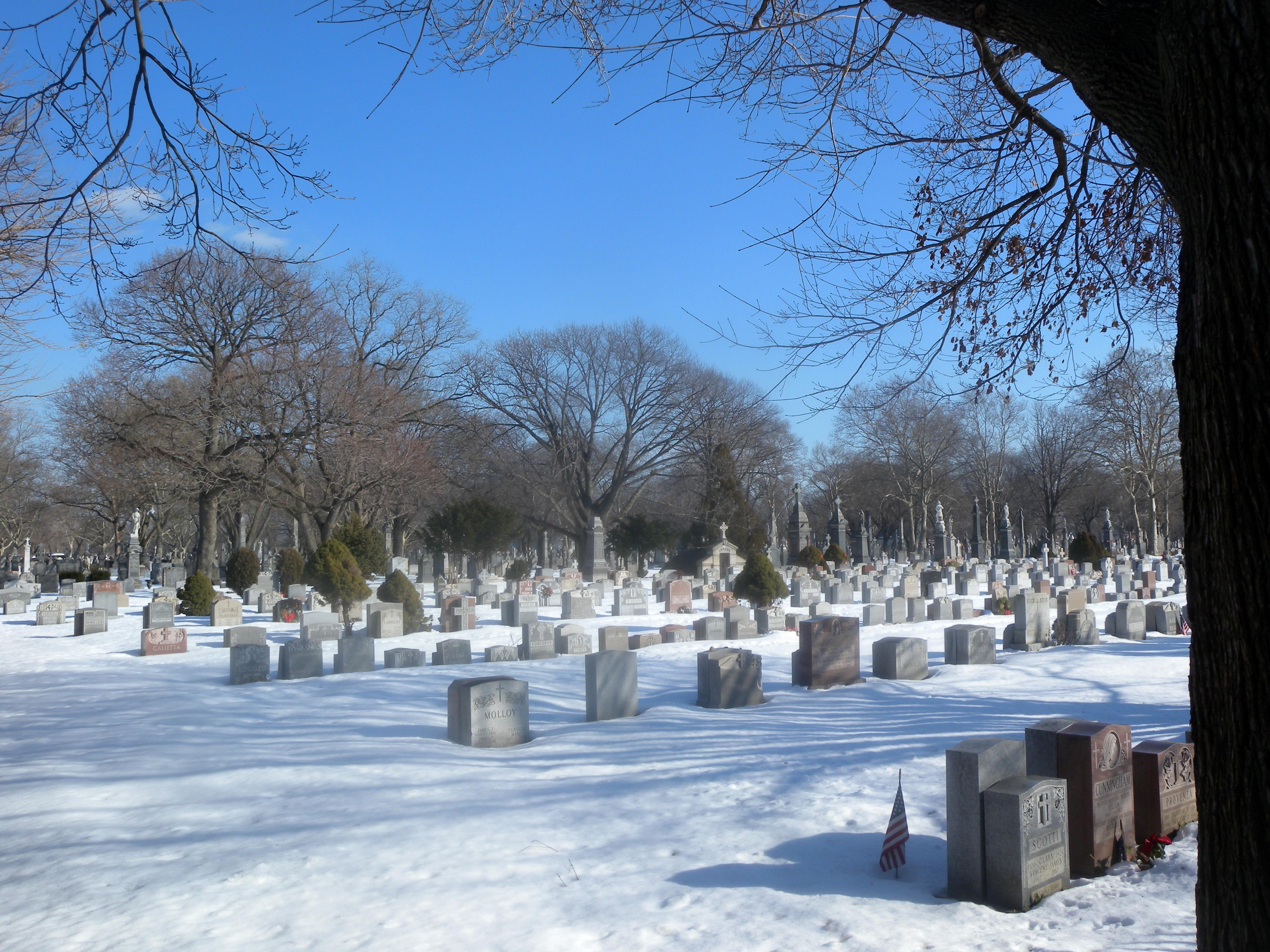

- John J. Bennett Jr. – Soldier and lawyer
- Diamond Jim Brady – American businessman and philanthropist
- John Bullman – American jockey
- Tommy Burns – Canadian and U.S. Hall of Fame jockey
- James Kenneth Campbell (1920-2004) - American lawyer
- Louis Capone – organized crime figure
- James Carey – Medal of Honor recipient
- John Michael Clancy – U.S. Representative
- Walter Donaldson – songwriter
- Timothy Donoghue (1825–1908) – Medal of Honor recipient during American Civil War
- "Sunny Jim" Fitzsimmons – American Hall of Fame racehorse trainer
- Joseph C. H. Flynn – lawyer, politician, and magistrate
- Edward H. Garrison – American Hall of Fame jockey
- William Russell Grace (1832–1904) – Irish-American businessman and former Mayor of New York City
- Frank Hayes (1901–1922) – won a steeplechase despite suffering a fatal heart midrace
- Gil Hodges (1924–1972) – Major League Baseball player and manager
- Patrick Keely – Architect
- Ardolph Loges Kline – New York City Mayor, U.S. Representative
- Frank J. Macchiarola – Chancellor of the New York City Schools, 1978–1983
- Hugh McLaughlin – Boss of the Brooklyn Democratic Party in the late 1800s
- Jean H. Norris – lawyer and first female magistrate of New York City
- Mícheál Ó Lócháin (1836–1899) – one of the foremost activists in behalf of the Irish Gaelic language in the United States. Founded the first periodical in which Irish Gaelic had a major place.
- Samuel O'Reilly patented the first electric tattoo machine.
- William R. Pelham – Medal of Honor recipient
- James J. Reynolds – educator
- Quentin Reynolds – journalist
- Frank Thompson (1852–1925) – first major-league baseball player born in Portugal
- Albert Weisbogel – two-time Medal of Honor recipient (unmarked grave)
- Frankie Yale (1893–1928) – organized crime figure
