= Edward Gabriel André Barrett =

American admiral

Edward André Gabriel Barrett
- Born: Edward André Gabriel Barrett; February 4, 1827; New Orleans, New Orleans, U.S.
- Died: March 31, 1880 (aged 53); New York City, New York, U.S.
- Spouse: Palmira De Ribrocchi
- Relatives: Thomas Barrett (father); Marie Henriette Griffon d’Anneville (mother); Giuseppe Alfredo Barrett (son); Paula Jenny Barrett (daughter); Virginia M. Elena Barrett (daughter); Camillo Barrett (son)
- Military career
- Allegiance: United States of America
- Branch: United States Navy
- Service years: 1840–1877
- Rank: Commodore
- Commands: USS Quinnebaug; USS Portsmouth; USS Savannah; USS Catskill; USS Canandaigua; USS Massasoit; USS Ticonderoga; USS Plymouth
- Conflicts: American Civil War; Mexican-American war

Commodore Edward André Gabriel Barrett, United States Navy, was born in New Orleans, Louisiana on 4 February 1827 and died of malaria in New York City on 31 March 1880. He was buried in the Holy Cross Catholic Cemetery in New York City. He was a member of the Military Order of the Loyal Legion of the United States (MOLLUS) and participated as a protagonist, in an active way to the American Civil War, to the development of world power the US and its military fleet, to fight slavery .

== Early life and naval career ==
The second of six children, he married the Noble Palmira De Ribrocchi of Tortona, Piedmont, Italy, in 1850 in Genoa. Palmira was the daughter of the Noble Giovanni Battista De Ribrocchi and Jousserandot Jeanne Francoise, of the Persange Barons. They had four children: Joseph Alfred, Paula Jenny, Virginia M. Elena and Camillo, who became a Garibaldian volunteer. From an article in the Army and Navy Journal, He later remarried in America, probably only civilly and had two other children, who were respectively 8 and 3 years old at the time of his death (1880).

Edward Barrett’s family, of Creole origins, was one of the most aristocratic of Louisiana. He descended on his mother side, from Marquis De Villiers, commander in chief of the French forces, to whom Washington surrendered after Braddock’s defeat.(Fort Necessity). His father, Thomas Barrett, was Collector of the Port of New Orleans for 15 years. This assignment was personally given to him by President Jackson. His mother, Marie Henriette Griffon d’Anneville, was from New Orleans.

He entered the US Navy at the age of 13. On 3 November 1840 he was appointed (Aspiring) Sub-lieutenant and assigned to the sloop USS Warren and USS Levant in the Bay of Pensacola. He was later transferred aboard the frigate USS Macedonian, of the squadron of the West Indies, under Commodore Nickolson's command.

His first voyage was aboard USS Levant, in the West Indies’ squadron. In July 1842 he was sent to hospital in Norfolk, Virginia. The following August he transferred to the frigate Columbus of the squadron of the Mediterranean. Upon arriving at the base he was sent to the sloop Preble and then again to Columbus departing for Brazil.

== Command assignments, 1847–1863 ==
In February 1846 he entered the Naval Academy of the United States and, in August 1847, was appointed Officer and immediately assigned to USS Mississippi, of the Gulf squadron. Upon arrival in Vera Cruz he served alternately on USS Raritan and, during the siege of the city, on USS John Adams. He took over from the defunct Sub-lieutenant Nelson in command of the Ambulance Corps working with the battery vessel. In 1847 he participated in the Battle of Alvarado aboard USS Mississippi. He then commanded the brigantine Cosa: the first and best conquest made during the war and proceeded with it to New Orleans. Returning to his ship of origin, he captured Maria Theresa, then moved back on Raritan and participated in the attack on Tuspan.

He served as a volunteer in the expedition of Frontera, of Tabasco and of Laguna. After the war he went home on sick leave.

In 1848 he resumed service and was sent to the Coast of Africa as an officer aboard USS Jamestown. He remained in that position for about two years. He then returned to the Mediterranean aboard USS Lexington, where he obtained a two-year license: these were the years of his marriage, fatherhood and of his longest stay in Europe.

Barrett spent most of the Crimean War period with the Mediterranean Squadron. The main purpose of the US Navy in the Mediterranean was to protect the interests of, as well as, the American citizens during the various revolutions that shook Europe in 1848. Many ships returned to Norfolk, Virginia in May 1850, when calm returned. In 1852 he reached the flagship of the Naval Squadron, USS Cumberland and then moved on to USS St. Louis and USS Saranac.

In 1854 he was appointed Commodore Breeze’s aide-de-flag. From 1855 to 1858 he was assigned to USS Constellation and USS Congress in the Mediterranean, and in 1858 he embarked on USS Constellation, returning to the United States. Towards the end of 1858 he served aboard USS Portsmouth on the African coast (to oppose the slave trade).

In 1860 he went, aboard USS Dacotah, to the East Indies and at the beginning of 1861, having just arrived, was appointed Instructor of Artillery and organized, for volunteers, the training ship USS Savannah until 1863.

== American Civil War, 1860–1865 ==
During the first phase of the conflict, Barrett took on the task of training officers and prepared two texts. The texts are still known in military literature. They are "Naval Howitzer" and "Gunnery Instructions"

In 1862, after allegations due to his birth in the South, Barrett was tried by martial court but was declared innocent, and received praise for his professional and patriotic services.

Barrett commanded USS Massasoit in 1863 and USS Catskill, a Passaic-class monitor outside Charleston. he was assigned to this command directly by the Secretary of the Navy, Welles, replacing the previous Commander Rodgers, who had died in combat. The ship was quickly repaired and ready to resume service. They had to conquer Charleston, but, first of all, stop the illegal trade which financed the South.

In 1864 his ship captured CSS Prince Albert, a corsair schooner and on 18 February 1865, he captured the boat Celt, while trying to force the blockade; the ship was secretly leaving Charleston on the night of 14 February.

USS Catskill also captured the British vessel Deer in similar circumstances; this was the last conquest made outside Charleston and the only conquest made by a Monitor. Both combatants considered the fall of Charleston disastrous for the fall of the South. Both Dahlgren (in two messages to Secretary Welles and Admiral Porter) and Wilkinson admitted it: the city of cotton, symbol of the spirit of the South, had fallen into the Unionist hands and, with it, all the hopes of the Confederates ended.

This also tells us that Commodore Edward Barrett was a great manipulator, as well as a brave fighter. The fact that a " monitor " managed to capture a boat that fast, equipped to transport cotton and violate the blockade, is reported in several newspaper articles which appeared after his death

In 1865 he reorganized the Artillery Department of the Arsenal of Norfolk, Virginia and was appointed Inspector of Small Arms for the US Navy in 1866.

== Last years ==
The same year he took command of USS Quinnebaug (the first warship that went into Cape Town, Africa), based in Brazil. In 1873 USS Ticonderoga, the following year USS Canandaigua and in 1875 USS Plymouth.

In addition to these services, it is worth recalling that Commander E. Barrett was assigned to the first warship which sailed into the harbor of Joliette in Marseille and on USS Congress, which was the first to enter the dam of Livorno, Italy. It was the first shipment that remounted the Yang - tse - Kiang to Hankow.

He commanded USS Plymouth, the ship sent by the Government to attend the closing of the International Expo. It was also the first to test the Eads jetties in the spring of 1877. In that period six sailors of USS Plymouth were awarded the Medal of Honor. On the occasion of the July 1877 riots, (Labor strikes), Barrett was called to Washington, where he organized a brigade of naval sailors and marines for the protection of the city and public establishments and held the command of the first aid force until all danger had passed

Edward Barrett wrote several works, still remembered and studied today including: “Temporary Fortifications”, “Dead Reckoning”, "Gunnery Instructions" and "Naval Howitzer".

== Family ==
Commodore E. Barrett was married to Palmira De Ribrocchi and had four children:

- Giuseppe Alfredo Barrett
- Paula Jenny Barrett
- Virginia M. Elena Barrett
- Camillo Barrett (1851 - 1924)

== Bibliography ==
- "The United States Army and Navy Journal and Gazette of The Regular and Volunteer Forces", Vol. 17, Army and Navy Journal Incorporated, 1880
- "The records of living officers of the U.S. navy and Marine corps" - L.R. Hamersly
- "Tortona insigne" - Un millennio di storia delle famiglie tortonesi - Copertina rigida – 1978 di Berruti Aldo edito dalla Cassa di Rispamio di Tortona;
- "Naval Howitzer", Edward Barrett 1863, reprint of 2005 - Wind Canyon Books (Brawley-CA 92227)
- "GUNNERY INSTRUCTIONS", Di LIEUT-COMMANDER EDWARD BARRETT, E'book
- "General Orders and Circulars US Navy"
- "Monitors of the U.S. Navy 1861-1937". Paperback – 1969 by Naval History Div. US Navy (Author)
- "United Service", Vol. 1, 1879
- "Army and Navy Journal 1880, April 13, 1880"
- "Army and Navy Journal 1880, April 10, 1880"
