= Naval Hospital Boston =

- Navy
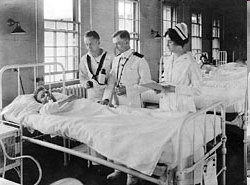
- Boston Naval Hospital; a surgeon and others examine a patient in 1919

Geography
- Location: Chelsea, Massachusetts, Massachusetts, United States
- Coordinates: 42°23′22.81″N 71°2′51.53″W

Organization
- Type: Military

History
- Founded: 1836
- Closed: 1974

Links
- Lists: Hospitals in Massachusetts

Naval Hospital Boston was a hospital in Chelsea, Massachusetts. With the closure of the nearby Boston Navy Yard, the hospital closed in 1974.

== History ==
On January 7, 1836 the Chelsea Naval Hospital was completed and commissioned. Located on a hill on the banks of the Mystic River in Chelsea, MA, it is 112 feet (34 m) above sea level. The original building was built of Vermont granite. The hospital was a three-story building with a 100-bed capacity. A wing was added on the west side of the building in 1865.

Chelsea Naval Hospital was one of the first three hospitals authorized by Congress to accommodate naval personnel. Previously, personnel received treatment at marine hospitals operated by the Department of the Treasury for mariners, both naval and merchant. The hospital served naval personnel and others during the American Civil War, Spanish–American War, World War I and World War II.

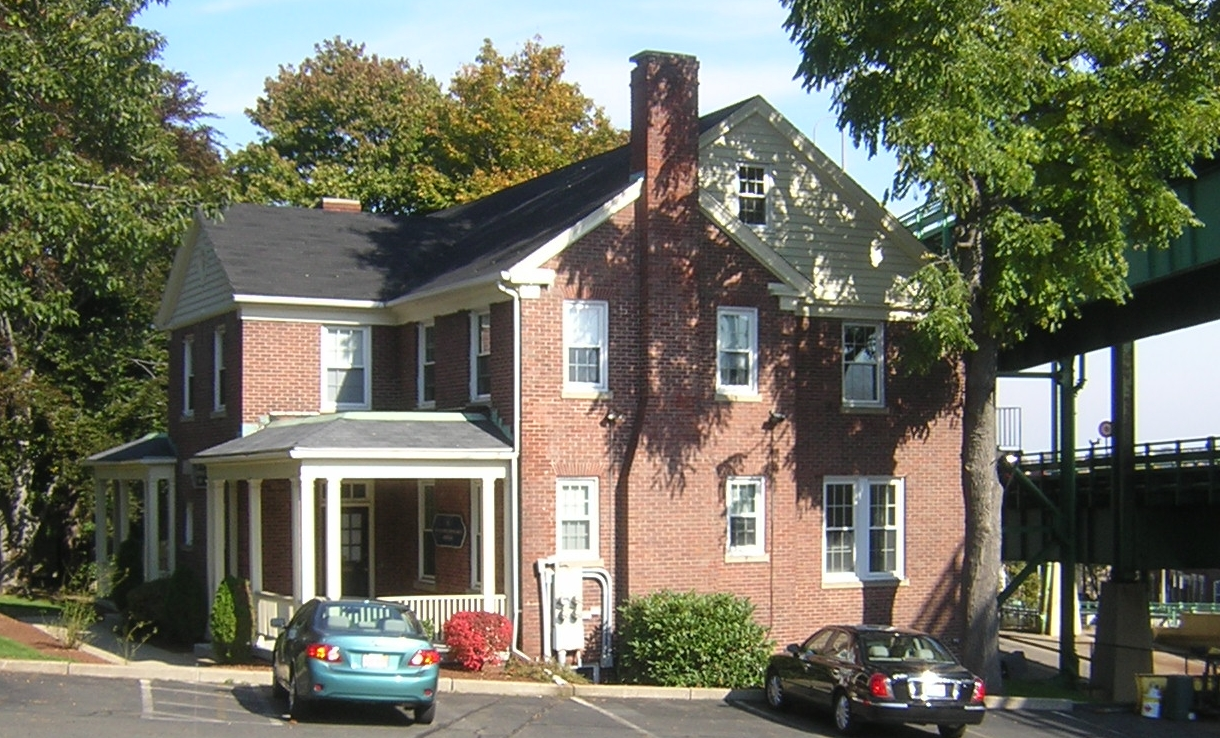
Chelsea Naval Hospital building

In 1970, a plaque in remembrance of Medal of Honor recipient Wayne Maurice Caron, a hospital corpsman, was placed on the grounds of the hospital. In 1973, the hospital and the surrounding grounds were added to the Naval Hospital Boston Historic District.

When it was decommissioned in 1974, it was the oldest naval hospital in service in the United States and consisted of 88 acres (360,000 m^{2}) of land on the Mystic River. Notable patients during the hospital's history include Presidents John Quincy Adams (after his presidency) and John F. Kennedy (before his presidency). The original hospital buildings were converted into condominiums while adjacent land was dotted with single family townhouses and high rise apartment complexes. Still extant are the perimeter wall and guard shack, pier, chapel, ordnance buildings, nurses' quarters, and the Captain's House. In addition to the redevelopment of the housing and hospital portion of the property, several acres on the Mystic River were taken over by the Metropolitan District Commission for Mary O'Malley Park.

== Historic district ==
- Naval Hospital Boston Historic District
- U.S. National Register of Historic Places
- U.S. Historic district
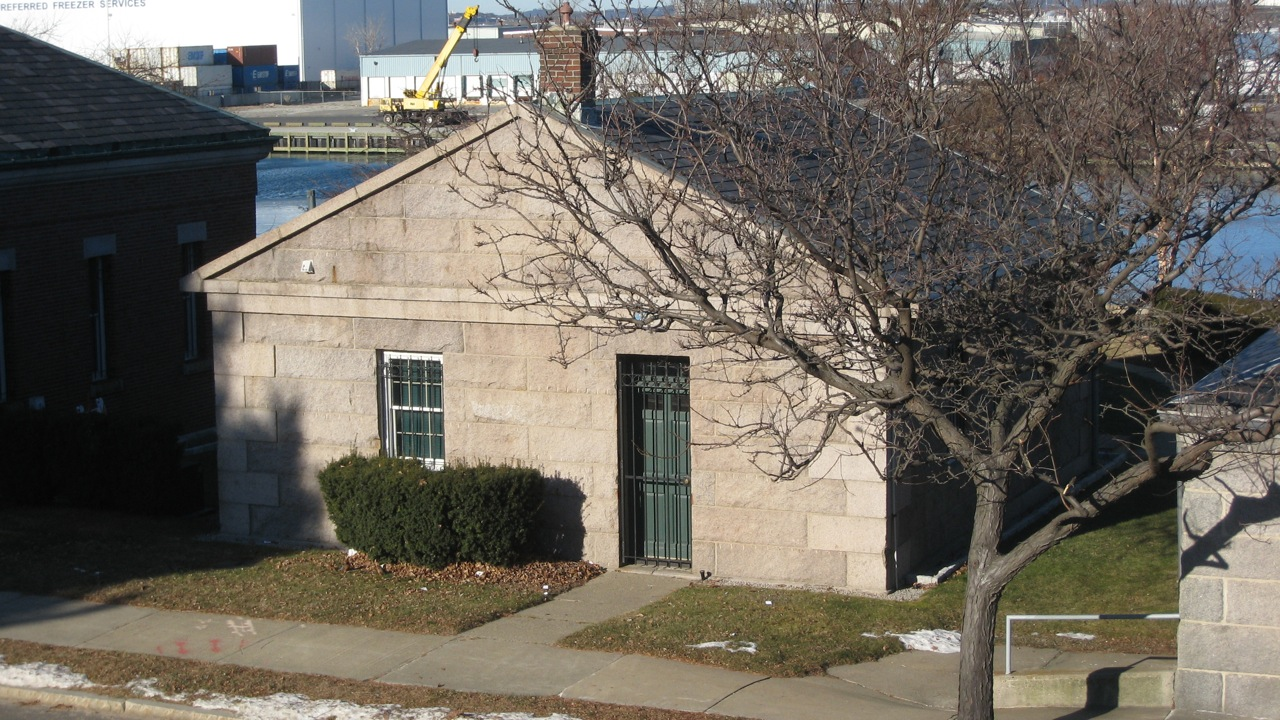
- The small ordnance building in 2009

- Location within Massachusetts Location within the United States
- Location: 1 Broadway, Chelsea, Massachusetts
- Coordinates: 42°23′19″N 71°2′45″W
- Area: 87.9 acres (35.6 ha)
- Built: 1836
- Architect: Multiple
- NRHP reference No.: 73000851
- Added to NRHP: August 14, 1973

Naval Hospital Boston Historic District is a historic district at the south end of Broadway, encompassing the area around Naval Hospital Boston. It consists of five buildings, historically the original 1836 Naval hospital, the 1857 Marine hospital, the Commanding Officer's quarters, and two ordnance buildings.

The district was added to the National Register of Historic Places in 1973.

=== 1836 Naval hospital ===
The original hospital was built of granite and was used as personnel quarters after a new hospital was built in 1915; it has been converted into condominiums.

=== 1857 Marine hospital ===
The Marine hospital was a three-story building built of brick with an I-shaped footprint; a fourth story was added in 1866. The building was returned to the Navy in 1940. It has been converted into condominiums.

=== Commanding Officer's quarters ===
Parts of the Commanding Officer's quarters date back to 1856.

=== Ordnance buildings ===
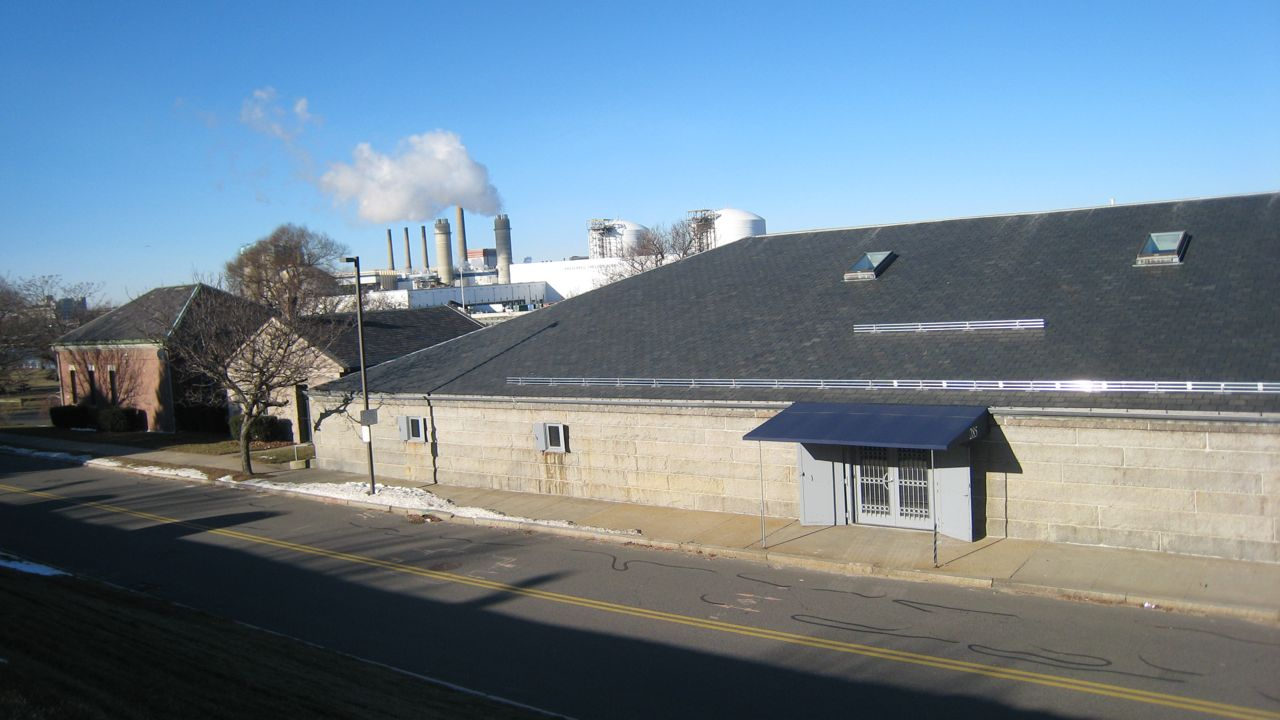
The magazine on right

Two buildings on the site were built in the early 19th century to handle ordnance for the United States Navy. The buildings were built by the Bureau of Ordnance and the land was transferred back to the hospital in 1910.

The larger building was designed to securely store explosives and ordnance and was not intended for human occupancy. It was a building within a building - an 1830s structure, without its original roof, encased within an 1860s structure which added the current exterior walls and a new roof. The architect and engineer Alexander Parris designed the inside structure. The floor is concrete and the interior is raw masonry, unpainted and unfinished. The ceilings are made of brick and include vaults which were designed to contain fire and force explosions upward rather than outward.

The smaller building was used for quarters after being returned to the hospital, then as storage space.

== See also ==
- National Register of Historic Places listings in Suffolk County, Massachusetts
- List of military installations in Massachusetts
