= Thomas Oliver Selfridge Jr. =

US Navy admiral (1836–1924)

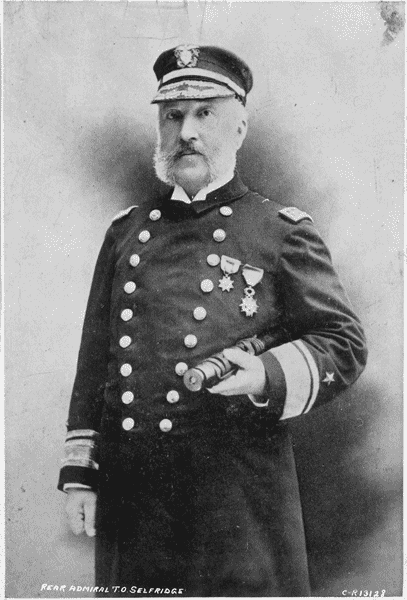
- Photograph of Rear Admiral Thomas O Selfridge Jr.
- Born: February 6, 1836; Charlestown, Massachusetts, U.S.
- Died: February 4, 1924 (aged 87); Washington, D.C., U.S.
- Relatives: Thomas O. Selfridge (father)
- Military career
- Allegiance: United States
- Branch: United States Navy
- Service years: 1854–1898
- Rank: Rear Admiral
- Conflicts: American Civil War

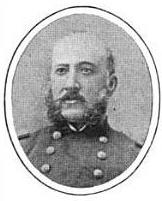
Unattributed photo of Rear Admiral Thomas O. Selfridge Jr.

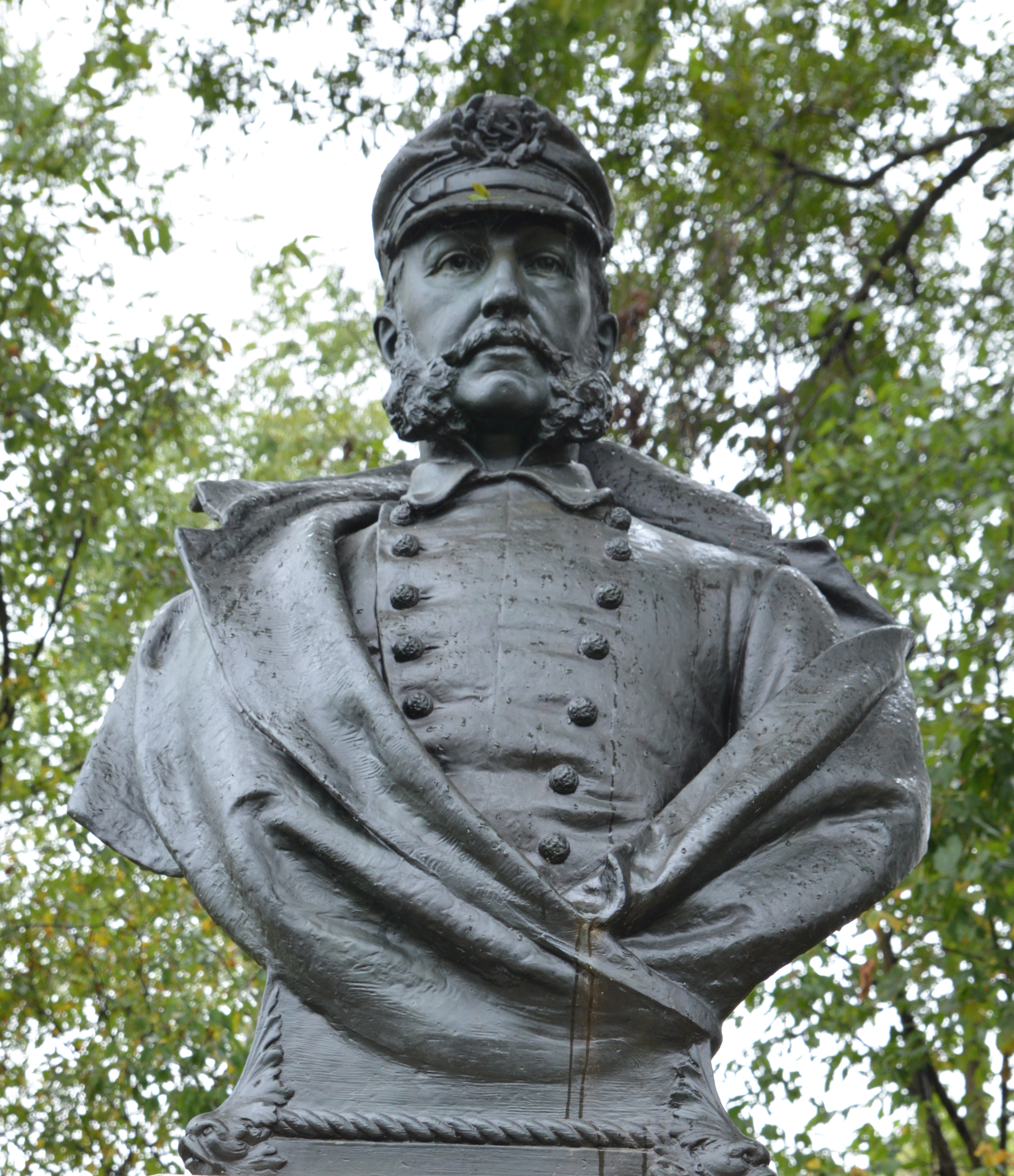
Memorial to Thomas O. Selfridge Jr., Vicksburg National Military Park

Thomas Oliver Selfridge Jr. (February 6, 1836 – February 4, 1924), son of Rear Admiral Thomas O. Selfridge, was an officer in the United States Navy.

== Early life ==
Born in Charlestown, Massachusetts, Selfridge graduated from the United States Naval Academy in 1854. He was the first officer to receive a diploma from the Academy.

== Civil War ==
At the beginning of the American Civil War, he helped with efforts to destroy the untenable Norfolk Navy Yard; and he then escaped from that burning and beleaguered base in the USS Cumberland, helping to save the sloop of war for the Union Navy. He participated in the capture of the Hatteras forts and was on board Cumberland on 8 March 1862 when she was sunk by Confederate ironclad, CSS Virginia. He then briefly commanded USS Monitor, after Lieutenant John L. Worden was wounded; and then commanded the USS Alligator, an experimental submarine, in testing operations based at the Washington Navy Yard.

In August 1862, he joined the Mississippi Squadron, and subsequently commanded the USS Cairo and the USS Conestoga when those ships were sunk in action. Late in the war, he returned to the Atlantic where he commanded the USS Huron in the attacks on Fort Fisher; and he participated in the ensuing bombardment of Fort Anderson and the capture of Wilmington, North Carolina.

== Postwar ==
His postwar service included command of USS Nipsic, USS Enterprise, and USS Omaha – the last two on the Asiatic Station. In 1870, while in command of the first of these ships, he led an expedition to Panama, surveying the landscape for a route that could be used for a canal. He also conducted subsequent expeditions to this area later in 1870 and again 1873. Although the route he proposed was not actually used for the Panama Canal, his work did show that Darien was not a good choice, thus narrowing down the construction possibilities.

He was promoted to captain in 1881. While in command of the Omaha in 1887, Selfridge conducted target practice off the coast of the Japanese island of Ikeshima which resulted in the deaths of four Japanese and the wounding of seven others. This created an international incident, but Selfridge was acquitted at a court martial in 1888.

In 1885, Captain Selfridge, of the U. S. man-of-war Omaha, delegated a lieutenant to present his compliments to Captain De Saune, the French commander of the Isère, laden with the Statue of Liberty, and suggest that Gravesend Bay would be a safer anchorage than the Sandy Hook Horseshoe.

He was promoted to commodore in 1894 and then had duty as Commander in Chief of the European Squadron from 1895 to 1898. While commanding the European Squadron his flagship was the cruiser USS San Francisco. He was promoted to rear admiral in 1896, which made him and his father the first father and son to be admirals in the United States Navy.

His nephew, First Lieutenant Thomas Etholen Selfridge, a US Army Field Artillery officer and one of the first pilots in the nascent Army Air Service, became the first person to die in the crash of a powered airplane in 1908.

Rear Admiral Selfridge retired on February 6, 1898. He died from heart disease in Washington, D.C., on February 4, 1924. Effects from his estate were put up for auction by C.G. Sloan & Co. of Washington, D.C., in 1926.

Like his father, he was a Veteran Companion of the Military Order of the Loyal Legion of the United States and an Honorary Hereditary Companion of the Military Order of Foreign Wars. He was also a Chevalier of the French Legion of Honor.

== Namesake ships ==
USS Selfridge (DD-320) was named for the elder Rear Admiral Selfridge, while USS Selfridge (DD-357) was named for both officers.
