= USS Coghlan =

Two ships of United States Navy were named USS Coghlan for Joseph Bulloch Coghlan:

- USS Coghlan (DD-326), was a destroyer commissioned in 1921 and decommissioned in 1930.
- USS Coghlan (DD-606), was a destroyer, commissioned in 1942 and decommissioned in 1947.
