= William F. Halsey Sr. =

United States Navy officer

- Born: 11 April 1853; New York, New York, U.S.
- Died: 11 June 1920 (aged 67)

William Frederick Halsey (April 11, 1853 – June 11, 1920) was a United States naval officer. He is the father of William Halsey Jr., one of only four American naval officers to obtain the five-star rank of Fleet Admiral.

== Biography ==
=== Early life ===
William Frederick Halsey was born on April 11, 1853, in New York, New York, the son of Eliza Grace (King) and Charles Henry Halsey. He was a descendant of United States Senator Rufus King. He was appointed to the United States Naval Academy from Louisiana and entered naval service a midshipman at the Naval Academy in September 1869.

=== Career ===
As a lieutenant, Halsey was stationed on the USS Ranger (c. 1888), USS Miantonomoh (c. 1894), USS New York (c. 1894) and was navigator of the USS Newark in May 1898. During the Spanish–American War the Newark served as the flagship of Commodore John C. Watson during the engagement of Aguadores and as part of the fleet blockading Santiago, Cuba. That September, he received orders to the Naval Academy.

In 1898 he became a member of the Pennsylvania Commandery of the Military Order of Foreign Wars.

In February 1900, he received orders detaching him from the Naval Academy and ordering him to report to the USS Adams, as Executive Officer, in San Diego, California.

Halsey was promoted to commander in 1902 and served as head of the Department of Seamanship at the United States Naval Academy. While a commander, he served as commanding officer of the USS Atlanta (briefly, in 1905) and the USS Des Moines (c. 1905).

Halsey was promoted to the rank of captain in 1906. He retired from the Navy, at his own request, on June 30, 1907, but continued to serve on active duty at the Bureau of Construction and Repair until 1919.

=== Death ===
He died on June 11, 1920, and was buried in Arlington National Cemetery. His wife Anne, who died on May 25, 1947, is buried with him, and his son, Fleet Admiral William "Bull" Halsey, Jr. (October 30, 1882 – August 16, 1959) is buried beside him.

== Personal life ==
He married Anne Masters Brewster, and on October 30, 1882, their son, future World War II hero Bull Halsey, was born in Elizabeth, New Jersey, so much so that the city has now named a high school after him and his proud legacy of Elizabeth.

== Dates of rank ==
- Midshipman – September 22, 1869
- Passed Midshipman – May 1872
- Ensign – 16 July 1874
- Master – March 18, 1880
- Lieutenant – March 4, 1886
- Lieutenant Commander – March 3, 1899
- Commander – November 2, 1902
- Captain – September 12, 1906

| Ensign | Lieutenant Junior Grade | Lieutenant | Lieutenant Commander | Commander | Captain |
| O-1 | O-2 | O-3 | O-4 | O-5 | O-6 |
| July 1874 | March 1883 | March 1886 | March 1899 | November 1902 | September 1906 |
