= William Henry Harrison Benyaurd =

American military officer (1841–1900)

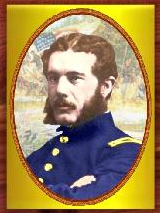
- William Henry Harrison Benyaurd
- Born: May 17, 1841; Philadelphia, Pennsylvania, U.S.
- Died: February 7, 1900 (aged 58); New York City, U.S.
- Military career
- Allegiance: United States
- Branch: United States Army
- Service years: 1863–1900
- Rank: Lieutenant Colonel
- Conflicts: American Civil War; Spanish–American War
- Awards: Medal of Honor

William Henry Harrison Benyaurd (May 17, 1841 – February 7, 1900) was a Union Army officer during the American Civil War who earned the Medal of Honor for his actions at Five Forks, Virginia on April 1, 1865.

== Military career ==
Benyaurd graduated sixth in his class at West Point in 1863. Upon graduation he was immediately promoted to the rank of first lieutenant in the Corps of Engineers.

In August 1864 he was breveted to the rank of captain for "gallantry and meritorious service" in the campaign before Richmond, Virginia. In April 1865, he received a brevet to major for heroism in the Battle of Five Forks. He was awarded the Medal of Honor on September 7, 1897, for the same action.

From 1866 to 1869, Benyaurd served as an assistant professor at West Point. In 1874, President Ulysses S. Grant appointed him to a special five-man commission to develop a reclamation plan for the Mississippi River Valley. Benyaurd served as a commissioner intensively studying the waterway until 1879, when Congress created the current Mississippi River Commission. He was then assigned to waterway maintenance on the tributaries to the lower Mississippi River, which included an ongoing effort to clear snags caused by vessels which sank there during or after the Civil War.

He was promoted to the rank of lieutenant colonel in 1889. During the Spanish–American War he was in charge of submarine defenses (i.e., mines) at Jacksonville and Tampa Bay, Florida. He was also in command of defensive fortification on the St. John River in Florida.

He was a member of the Military Order of the Loyal Legion of the United States and the Military Order of Foreign Wars.

== Legacy ==
The United States Army Corps Of Engineers operates a large towboat named in his honor. The Motor Vessel (M/V) Benyaurd works out of the Corps of Engineers' Mississippi Valley Division in Vicksburg, Mississippi, as is assigned to the Corps' Vicksburg District.

== Promotions ==
- 1st Lieutenant – June 11, 1863
- Brevet Captain – August 1, 1864
- Brevet Major – April 1, 1865
- Captain – May 1, 1866
- Major – March 4, 1879
- Lieutenant Colonel – July 2, 1889

== Medal of Honor citation ==
"With one companion, voluntarily advanced in a reconnaissance beyond the skirmishers, where he was exposed to imminent peril; also, in the same battle, rode to the front with the commanding general to encourage wavering troops to resume the advance, which they did successfully."
