= William J. McKee (soldier) =

United States Army general

William James McKee (December 12, 1853, Madison, Indiana – December 24, 1925, Indianapolis, Indiana) was an American soldier. He was the son of Robert S. and Celine (Lodge) McKee.

He graduated from the Collegiate and Commercial institute in New Haven, Connecticut, and engaged in mercantile interests in Indianapolis. He was married on February 20, 1878, to Fannie B. McKinney (1856–1944) of Indianapolis.

He joined the Indiana National Guard and, in May 1893, was appointed brigadier-general, commanding. At the outbreak of the Spanish–American War, he was appointed brigadier-general in the United States Volunteers (U.S.V.) on May 27, 1898, and was placed in command of the 2d Brigade, 2d Division, 1st Corps; the 2d Division, 1st Corps; the 3d Brigade, 1st Division, 1st Corps and the 2d Separate Brigade, 2d Corps. He served in camps at Chickamauga National Park, Georgia, Knoxville, Tennessee, and Macon, Georgia.

He was honorably discharged from the volunteer service on March 15, 1899, and returned to Indianapolis, being recommissioned brigadier-general, commanding, Indiana National Guard, on the same day.

He was a Veteran Companion of the Military Order of Foreign Wars.

== Sources ==
- Johnson, Rossiter, ed. Twentieth Century Biographical Dictionary of Notable Americans. Vol. I–X. Boston, MA, USA: The Biographical Society, 1904.
