= USS Selfridge (DD-357) =

Porter-class destroyer

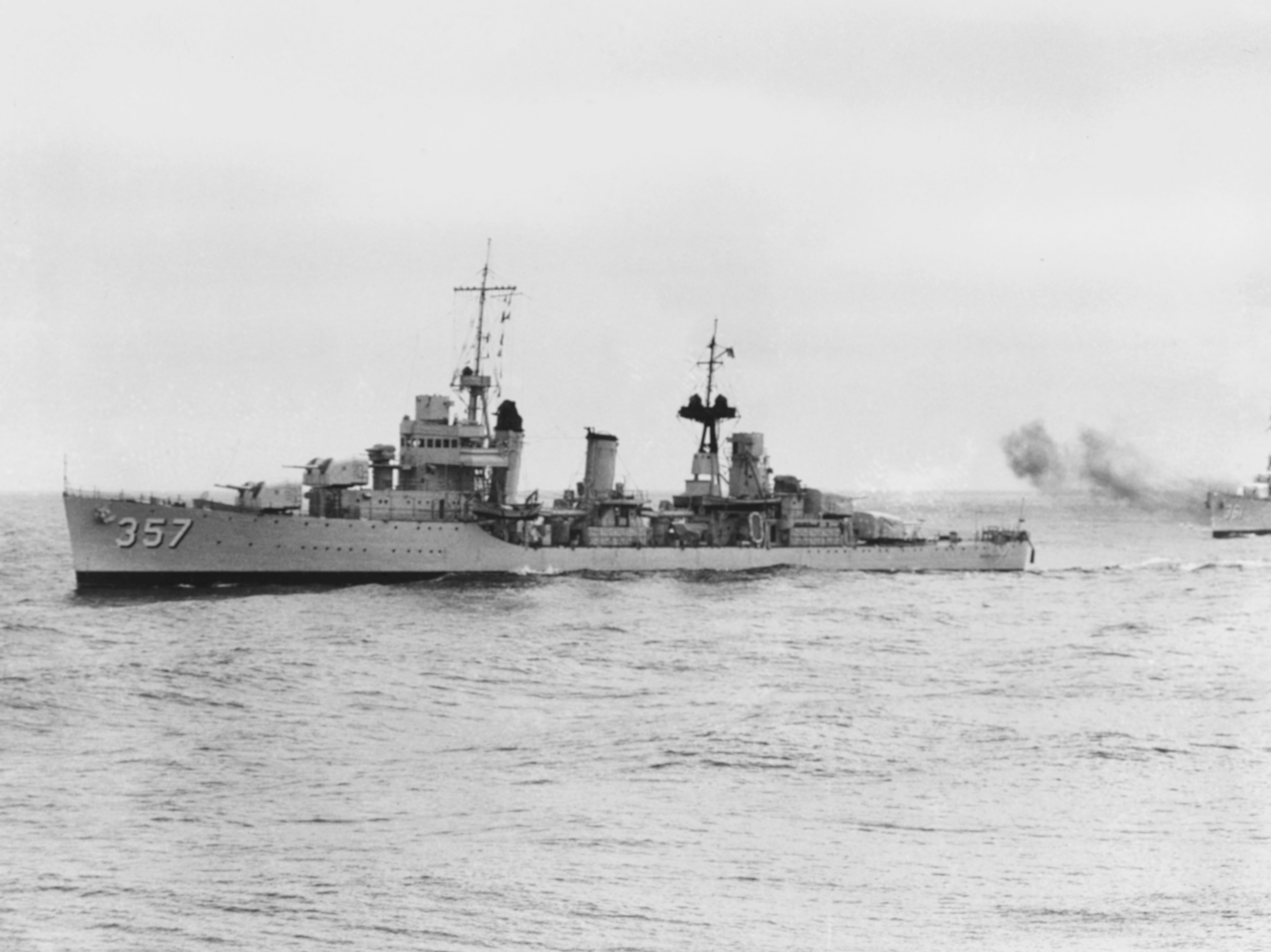
- USS Selfridge c. late 1930s

History

United States
- Builder: New York Shipbuilding Corporation
- Laid down: 18 December 1933
- Launched: 18 April 1936
- Commissioned: 25 November 1936
- Decommissioned: 15 October 1945
- Stricken: 1 November 1945
- Fate: Sold 20 December 1946 and scrapped

General characteristics
- Class & type: Porter-class destroyer
- Displacement: 1,850 tons, 2,597 tons full
- Length: 381 ft (116 m)
- Beam: 36 ft 2 in (11.02 m)
- Draught: 10 ft 5 in (3.18 m)
- Propulsion: 50,000 shp (37,285 kW); geared turbines, 2 screws
- Speed: 35 knots (65 km/h)
- Range: 6,500 nm @ 12 knots (12,000 km @ 22 km/h)
- Complement: 194
- Armament: As built: 1 × Mk35 Gun Fire Control System; 8 × 5″ (127 mm)/38 cal SP (4×2); 8 × 1.1″ (28 mm) AA (2×4); 8 × 21-inch (533 mm) T Tubes (2×4); c. 1944: 1 × Mk37 Gun Fire Control System; 5 × 5″ (127mm)/38 cal DP (2×2, 1×1); 1 × Mk51 Gun Director; 4 × Bofors 40mm AA (1×4); 8 × Oerlikon 20mm AA (8×1); 2 × Depth charge stern racks

USS Selfridge (DD-357) was a Porter-class destroyer in the United States Navy. She was named for Rear Admiral Thomas O. Selfridge (1804–1902) and his son, Thomas O. Selfridge Jr. (1836–1924). She was the second ship named Selfridge, the first being a Clemson-class destroyer.

Selfridge was laid down by the New York Shipbuilding Corporation at Camden in New Jersey on 18 December 1933, launched on 18 April 1936 and commissioned at Philadelphia on 25 November 1936.

== Shakedown ==
Selfridge conducted her shakedown cruise in the Mediterranean in January and February 1937 and returned to the east coast, via the Caribbean, in March. From April into August, she underwent post-shakedown overhaul at, and conducted training exercises out of Philadelphia, Pennsylvania. In September, Presidential escort duties took her to Poughkeepsie, New York; and, in October, she proceeded to Norfolk, Virginia, whence she got underway for the Panama Canal Zone and duty with the Battle Force in the Pacific. Diverted back to Norfolk for another Presidential escort mission in early November, she got underway again for the west coast on 9 December 1937.

== Pearl Harbor ==
Selfridge transited the Panama Canal and joined the Battle Force as flagship of Destroyer Squadron (Des-Ron) 4 on 13 December 1937 and reached San Diego, California on the 22nd. Except for fleet problems and exercises, she remained in the southern California area for the next two years. In 1940, she was reassigned to Pearl Harbor, whence she operated until after the Japanese attack on 7 December 1941. That day, Selfridge, having just completed an escort run from Palmyra Island, was moored in berth X-9. Within five minutes of the start of the bombing, Selfridge's guns were firing on the Japanese planes. By 1300, manned by a mixed crew from various ships, she was underway and soon thereafter joined other ships in patrolling off Oahu.

During the remainder of the month, Selfridge patrolled the Hawaiian area and, screening Saratoga, participated in the abortive attempt to reinforce Wake Island. In January 1942, she continued operations in the Saratoga group until that carrier was torpedoed some 500 miles southwest of Oahu on the 11th. Selfridge then screened the carrier back to Pearl Harbor. Exercises and patrols in the Hawaiian area followed until 20 January when she assumed escort duty for a merchant ship on a Canton Island run. After arriving at Canton on the 27th, she patrolled off the island until the merchant ship completed offloading, then started back to Hawaii. En route, on the 30th, Selfridge depth charged and may have damaged an enemy submarine.

== Guadalcanal ==
Selfridge returned to Pearl Harbor on 6 February 1942 and was under way again on the 9th to escort Saratoga to Bremerton, Washington for permanent repairs. In mid-March, she returned to Hawaii in the screen of a convoy and, by the end of the month, had escorted more supplies to Canton. In April, she carried Marine Corps personnel and mail to Palmyra and Christmas islands, and then proceeded to Bora Bora in the Society Islands, to rendezvous with and escort convoys carrying reinforcements to the Samoan and Tonga groups. On 21 May 1942, she departed the latter group for the New Hebrides and Australia; where, by the end of the month, she had commenced coastal escort work. A unit of TF 44, she remained in Australian waters into July; then, with others of the force, proceeded to the Fiji Islands to rehearse for Operation Watchtower, the assault and occupation of Guadalcanal and Tulagi.

Soon after 0120 on 7 August 1942, TF 44, now designated TG 62.6, the screening group for the transports, arrived in the Guadalcanal area. At 0620, Selfridge opened fire on a small gasoline carrier entering Tulagi harbor. A few hours later, the transports moved in toward the beaches. At 1320, the Japanese sent in a high level bombing attack. Shortly thereafter, they followed that strike with a dive bomber attack. On the 8th, Selfridge continued to screen the transports and, after a noon bombing attack, picked up two Japanese airmen. On the morning of the 9th, she assisted survivors of the Battle of Savo Island and, with Ellet, scuttled the badly damaged Australian cruiser, Canberra; then, toward evening, departed the area to escort the transports to Noumea.

For the remainder of the month, the Australian group (TF 44) screened the carriers of the air support group. On 31 August 1942, the ships headed back to Brisbane; and, for the next nine months, Selfridge continued to operate with that force in the Coral Sea to prevent a Japanese landing at Port Moresby and to cover Allied shipping to the Papuan Peninsula.

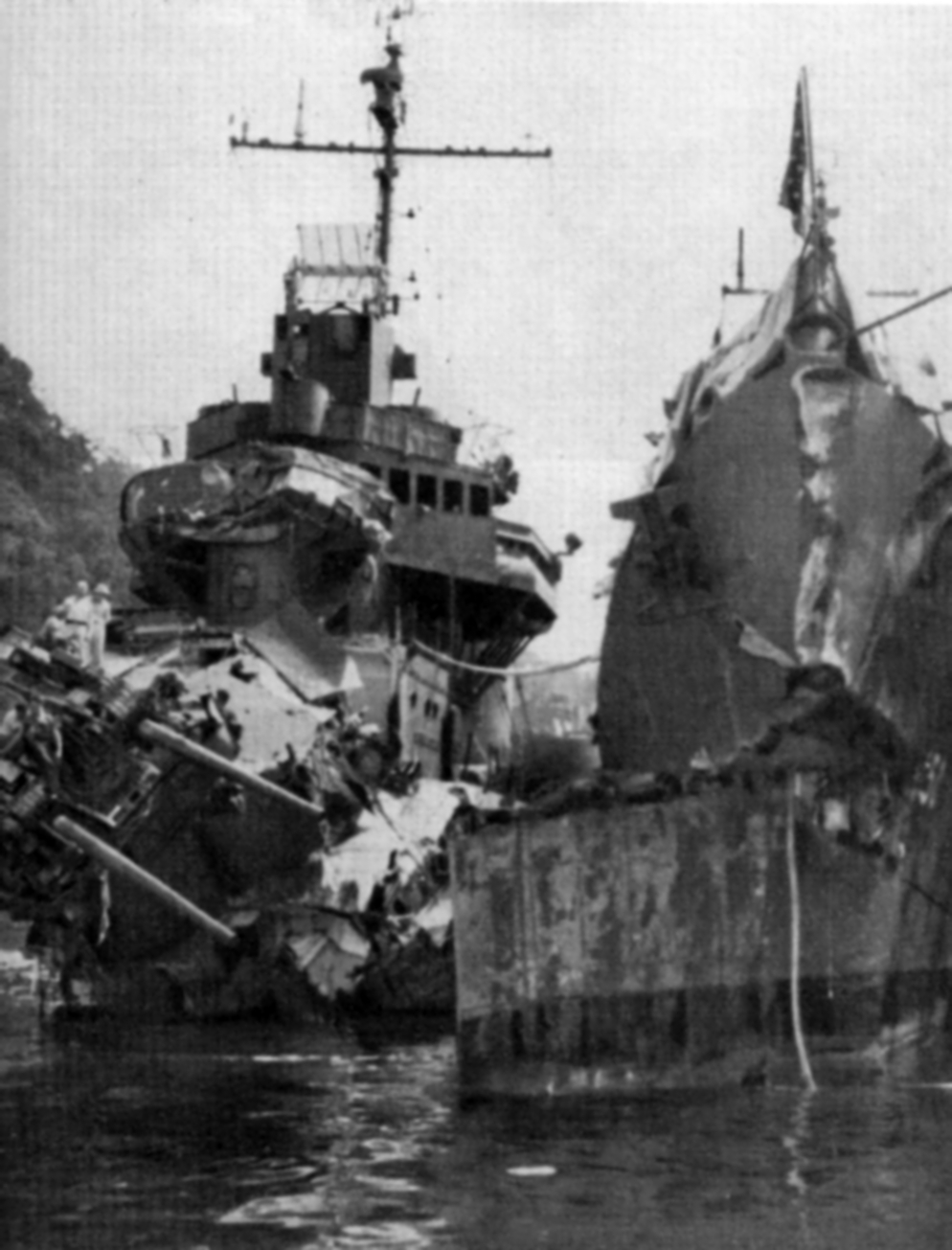
Damaged Selfridge and O'Bannon at Noumea after the battle.

== Battle of Vella Lavella ==
In May 1943, Selfridge was reassigned to the 3rd Fleet. On the 12th, she arrived at Nouméa. Through the summer, she operated with cruisers of TF 36, later TF 37, and participated in exercises with TF's 38, 39, and 34. In late September, as a unit of the 3d Fleet's amphibious force, she escorted an LST convoy to Vella Lavella, then commenced nighttime patrols in the Solomon Islands up "the Slot" to intercept Japanese shipping.

On the night of 6 October 1943, Selfridge, O'Bannon, and Chevalier intercepted an enemy force of six destroyers, three destroyer transports, and smaller armed craft some 12 miles off Marquana Bay as it attempted to evacuate land forces from Vella Lavella. In the ensuing Battle of Vella Lavella, Chevalier was torpedoed and damaged beyond repair. She was sunk on the 7th by an American torpedo. Selfridge and O'Bannon were both heavily damaged; Selfridge by an enemy torpedo, O'Bannon by enemy action compounded by collision with Chevalier just after the latter had gone dead in the water. Personnel casualties on board Selfridge amounted to 13 killed, 11 wounded, and 36 missing.

== 1944 ==
Temporary repairs to Selfridge were made at Purvis Bay and at Nouméa. Permanent repairs, including the installation of a new bow and a complete new gun armament, were made at the Mare Island Naval Shipyard; and, after refresher training out of San Diego, she returned to Pearl Harbor on 10 May 1944 in time to join the forces staging for the invasion of the Marianas Islands. Initially assigned to TG 50.11, she joined TF 58, the fast carrier force, at Majuro in early June; and, on the 11th, screened Bunker Hill as sweeps were conducted over Guam. On the 13th, she participated in a shore bombardment of Saipan to cover minesweeping operations off that target island; then shifted to night fire. On the 14th, she joined the fire support unit; and, on the 15th, screened the transport area as the assault troops landed on Saipan. From then to the 17th, she rotated between daytime screening activities and nighttime harassment duty. On the latter date, word of a Japanese force moving in from the Philippines reached the assault force, and Selfridge rejoined TF 58 and took station as the linking vessel between TG's 58.7 and 58.3. On the 19th, the Battle of the Philippine Sea raged; but none of the enemy's aircraft came within range of Selfridge's guns. On the 20th and 21st, the Japanese proceeded westward. On the 24th, Selfridge rejoined the transport screen off Saipan; and, on the 26th, resumed fire support duties.

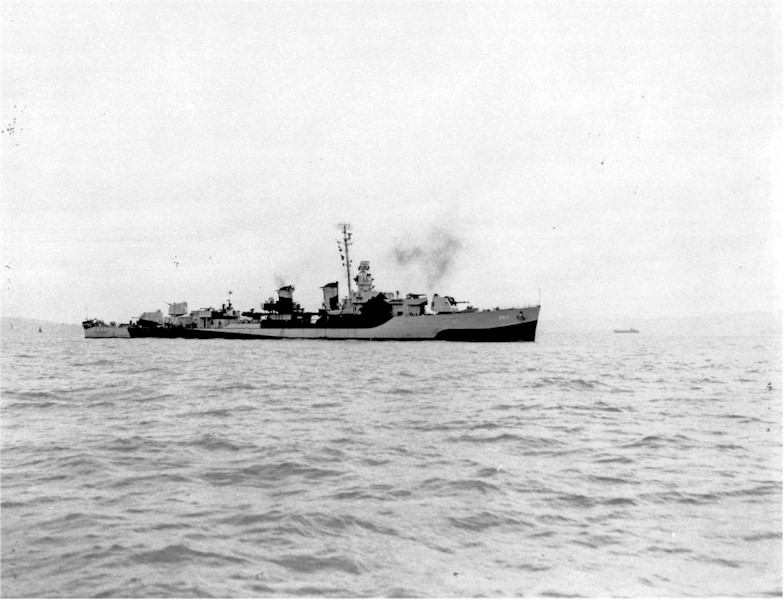
Selfridge after her rebuilding, April 1944.

Selfridge departed Saipan on 11 July 1944; and, screening the transports, arrived at Eniwetok on the 15th. Three days later, she was underway again to return to the Marianas with reinforcements for the Guam assault. She arrived off Agat on the 22d, the day after the initial assault and, for the next three weeks, provided screening and fire support services and conducted anti-boat and barge patrols. On 10 August, she sailed for Eniwetok, whence, she returned to Pearl Harbor. On 21 August, she received orders back to the Atlantic.

== 1945 ==
Transiting the Panama Canal on 7 September 1944, Selfridge proceeded to New York for an abbreviated overhaul after which she joined TF 65; and, serving as flagship, commenced transatlantic escort duty for convoys plying between the east coast and Tunisia. On 23 April 1945 she was in Casco Bay, Maine when USS Eagle 56 (PE-56) exploded. After assisting in rescuing survivors, she dropped nine depth charges on a suspected U-boat. A Court of Inquiry initially attributed the loss of Eagle 56 to a boiler explosion, but in 2001 the cause was revised to a torpedo from U-853. Continuing escort duty until after the fall of Germany in May 1945, she completed her last run at New York on 7 June. Upkeep and training exercises in the Caribbean and off the Maine coast took her through August; and, on 15 September, she returned to New York to prepare for inactivation.

On 15 October 1945, Selfridge was decommissioned, struck from the Navy list on 1 November 1945 and scrapped in October 1947.

She earned four battle stars during World War II.
