= Thomas Oliver Selfridge =

US Navy Admiral (1804–1902)

Thomas O. Selfridge
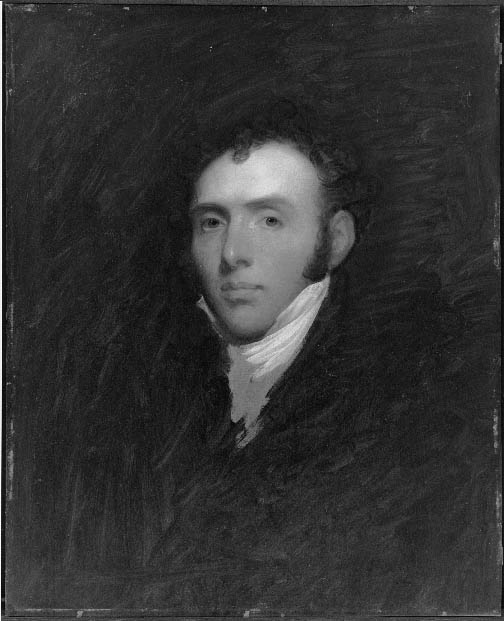
- Born: April 24, 1804
- Died: October 15, 1902 (aged 98); Waverley, Massachusetts, U.S.
- Relatives: Thomas O. Selfridge Jr. (son); Thomas Etholen Selfridge (grandson)
- Military career
- Allegiance: United States
- Branch: United States Navy
- Service years: 1818–1866
- Rank: Rear admiral
- Commands: Dale; Mississippi
- Conflicts: Mexican–American War; American Civil War

Rear Admiral Thomas Oliver Selfridge Sr. (24 April 1804 – 15 October 1902) was an officer in the United States Navy during the Mexican–American War and the American Civil War and was the father of another rear admiral, Thomas O. Selfridge Jr.

== Career ==
Selfridge was appointed midshipman on 1 January 1818, at the age of 13. Promoted to lieutenant in 1827, he served in the East India, Mediterranean, and Pacific Squadrons. He took command of the sloop USS Dale, in May 1847 and participated in the capture of Mazatlán and Guaymas. Badly wounded in the latter engagement, he was invalided home in June 1848.

He was promoted to captain in 1855 and was subsequently assigned to the Boston Navy Yard, where he remained until 1861. He commanded the paddle frigate USS Mississippi, flagship of the Gulf Squadron, on blockade duty off Mobile, Alabama and off the passes of the Mississippi River.

== Retirement ==
Selfridge's old wound forced him to relinquish his command in February 1862. He was promoted to commodore on July 16, 1862 and commanded the Mare Island Navy Yard until 1864. He retired from the Navy on April 24, 1866, after 48 years of service.

In 1867, he was promoted to the rank of rear admiral on the retired list to date from 25 July 1866 in honor of his long and distinguished career. When his son, Thomas O. Selfridge Jr., was promoted to rear admiral on February 28, 1896, they became the first father and son to be living when they were both U.S. Navy admirals.

He was a Companion of the First Class of the Military Order of the Loyal Legion of the United States and an Honorary Veteran Companion of the Military Order of Foreign Wars.

Rear Admiral Selfridge died in Waverley (now part of Belmont, Massachusetts) in 1902 at the age of 98.

== Namesakes ==
- The United States Navy destroyer USS Selfridge (DD-320) was named for him, while USS Selfridge (DD-357) was named for him and his son.

== Dates of rank ==
- Midshipman: 1 January 1818
- Lieutenant: 3 March 1827
- Commander: 11 April 1844
- Captain: 14 September 1855
- Commodore: 16 July 1862
- Retired: 24 April 1866
- Rear Admiral on Retired List: 25 July 1866
