= USS Coghlan (DD-326) =

Clemson-class destroyer

History

United States
- Namesake: Joseph Coghlan
- Builder: Bethlehem Shipbuilding Corporation, Union Iron Works, San Francisco
- Laid down: 25 June 1919
- Launched: 16 June 1920
- Commissioned: 31 March 1921
- Decommissioned: 1 May 1930
- Stricken: 22 October 1930
- Fate: Sold for scrapping, 17 January 1931

General characteristics
- Class & type: Clemson-class destroyer
- Displacement: 1,290 long tons (1,311 t) (standard); 1,389 long tons (1,411 t) (deep load)
- Length: 314 ft 4 in (95.8 m)
- Beam: 30 ft 11 in (9.42 m)
- Draught: 10 ft 3 in (3.1 m)
- Installed power: 27,000 shp (20,000 kW); 4 water-tube boilers
- Propulsion: 2 shafts, 2 steam turbines
- Speed: 35 knots (65 km/h; 40 mph) (design)
- Range: 2,500 nautical miles (4,600 km; 2,900 mi) at 20 knots (37 km/h; 23 mph) (design)
- Complement: 6 officers, 108 enlisted men
- Armament: 4 × single 4-inch (102 mm) guns; 2 × single 1-pounder AA guns or; 2 × single 3-inch (76 mm) guns; 4 × triple 21 inch (533 mm) torpedo tubes; 2 × depth charge rails

USS Coghlan (DD-326) was a Clemson-class destroyer built for the United States Navy during World War I.

== Description ==
The Clemson class was a repeat of the preceding Wickes class although more fuel capacity was added. The ships displaced 1,290 long tons (1,311 t) at standard load and 1,389 long tons (1,411 t) at deep load. They had an overall length of 314 feet 4 inches (95.8 m), a beam of 30 feet 11 inches (9.4 m) and a draught of 10 feet 3 inches (3.1 m). They had a crew of 6 officers and 108 enlisted men.

Performance differed radically between the ships of the class, often due to poor workmanship. The Clemson class was powered by two steam turbines, each driving one propeller shaft, using steam provided by four water-tube boilers. The turbines were designed to produce a total of 27,000 shaft horsepower (20,000 kW) intended to reach a speed of 35 knots (65 km/h; 40 mph). The ships carried a maximum of 371 long tons (377 t) of fuel oil which was intended gave them a range of 2,500 nautical miles (4,600 km; 2,900 mi) at 20 knots (37 km/h; 23 mph).

The ships were armed with four 4-inch (102 mm) guns in single mounts and were fitted with two 1-pounder guns for anti-aircraft defense. In many ships a shortage of 1-pounders caused them to be replaced by 3-inch (76 mm) guns. Their primary weapon, though, was their torpedo battery of a dozen 21 inch (533 mm) torpedo tubes in four triple mounts. They also carried a pair of depth charge rails. A "Y-gun" depth charge thrower was added to many ships.

== Construction and career ==
Coghlan, named for Joseph Coghlan, was launched 16 June 1920 by Bethlehem Shipbuilding Corporation, San Francisco; sponsored by Mrs. G. Coghlan; and commissioned 31 March 1921. Coghlan arrived at Charleston, South Carolina, 28 December 1921 for operations in East Coast and Caribbean waters. Coghlan took part in the funeral ceremonies for President Warren G. Harding at Washington (7–9 August 1923) and served as a plane guard in the North Atlantic (24 July – 6 September 1924) during the Army's round the-world flight.

From 18 June 1925 to 11 July 1926 she served with U.S. Naval Forces Europe in the Mediterranean protecting American interests. The destroyer returned to her cruising along the east coast and in the Caribbean, served as an exhibition vessel at the Philadelphia Sesquicentennial Exposition during the summer of 1926, cruised with the Special Service Squadron off Nicaragua (3 February – 31 March 1927), and took part in the Presidential Fleet Review, in Hampton Roads, 4 June 1927.

She was decommissioned at Philadelphia 1 May 1930, and sold for scrapping 17 January 1931 under terms of the London Naval Treaty.
