= Military Order of Foreign Wars =

U.S. veterans' and hereditary association

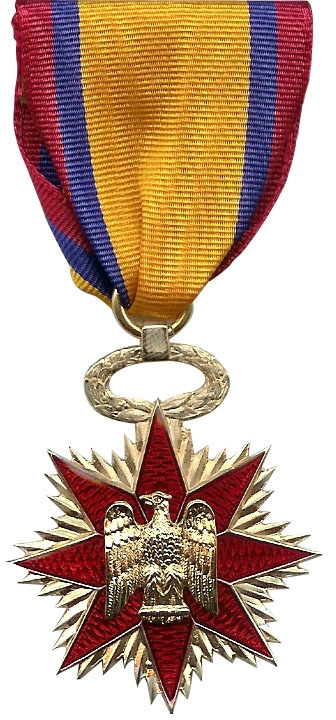
Military Order of Foreign Wars Insignia

The Military Order of Foreign Wars of the United States (MOFW) is one of the oldest veterans' and hereditary associations in the United States with a membership that includes officers and their hereditary descendants from all of the Armed Services. Membership is composed of active duty, reserve and retired officers of the United States Armed Services, including the Coast Guard, National Guard, and allied officers, and their descendants, who have served during one of the wars in which the United States has or is engaged with a foreign power.

== History ==
The Order was founded on December 13, 1894, in the office of Frank M. Avery in the Tribune Building in New York City. The first signer of the Order's "Institution" (founding document) was Major General Fitz John Porter who was a veteran of both the Mexican War and the Civil War. Eighteen others signed the Institution of which five were Mexican War veterans, nine were descendants of American Revolutionary War officers and four who were descendants of officers who served in the War of 1812.

The resultant Order was initially known as the Military and Naval Order of the United States and was organized and later incorporated under that name. Its hereditary line of descent spans the period of American history since national independence during the Revolutionary War. Initially membership in the Order was limited to officer veterans (and their hereditary descendants) of the Revolutionary War, the War of 1812, and the Mexican War. (In addition, there is a requirement that ancestors who were militia officers must have had active service during wartime.)

Although there were many individuals who served as officers in the American Civil War and the Indian Wars who were living at the time of the Order's founding, that service did not qualify them for membership as those wars were considered to be domestic rather than foreign wars.

In April 1895, the name of the Order was officially changed to its present name – The Military Order of Foreign Wars of the United States (MOFW). By the end of 1896, commanderies had been formed in seven states.

The MOFW was patterned after the Military Order of the Loyal Legion of the United States (MOLLUS) which was a military society for officers, and their descendants, who had served the Union during the American Civil War. As MOLLUS had restricted its membership to officers who had served in one particular war, the need was felt to have an organization for the descendants of officers who had served in the American Revolution, War of 1812 and the Mexican War – as well as the few surviving Mexican War veterans who were officers.

The influence of the Order spread rapidly and soon commanderies (state level organizations) were formed in other states. It was deemed advisable to form a National Commandery to centralize and coordinate the activities of the various state commanderies, and which would have general supervision and control over the policies and activities of the Order. The National Commandery was founded at a joint meeting of the individual state commanderies in March 1896 and General Alexander S. Webb was elected as the first Commander General.

The motto of the Military Order of Foreign Wars is the Latin phrase Deus et Libertas meaning God and Liberty.

The War and Navy Departments, and later the Department of Defense, under various resolutions of Congress, gave recognition to the Order and permitted the wearing of its insignia on uniforms.

== Membership qualifications ==
For the first two years of the MOFW's existence, membership categories were limited to Veteran and Hereditary companions who were either veteran officers or descendants of veteran officers who had served during the American Revolution, War of 1812, War with Tripoli or the Mexican War. Service during the American Civil War and the Indian Wars did not qualify as those were considered domestic rather than foreign conflicts.

In 1896 the membership category of Honorary Companion was created for presidents of the United States and officers who had attained the rank of major general or rear admiral. President William McKinley, President Grover Cleveland and Lieutenant General John M. Schofield were among the earliest honorary companions. The qualifications for Honorary Companions were later changed to require that officers be equal to or higher than lieutenant general or vice admiral.

The Spanish–American War of 1898 provided the Order with a great number of new Veteran Companions – particularly the Pennsylvania Commandery which, according to the MOFW Register published in 1900, accounted for over half of the Order's membership. Among the individuals who joined the MOFW between 1898 and 1900 were Admiral George Dewey, future president Theodore Roosevelt and future General of the Armies John J. Pershing. Most senior officers who served in the Spanish–American War were also veterans of the Civil War, and many belonged to both the MOFW and MOLLUS.

In 1928, a fourth membership status (junior companion) was created for sons of companions who had not reached the majority age of 21. In 1969, companionship was extended to those who served in an enlisted status during a foreign war and were later commissioned.

In time, the Order's membership qualifications were expanded to include service during conflicts with foreign powers which include, but are not limited to, the War with Spain, World War I, World War II, the Korean War, the Vietnam War, the Gulf War, the War in Iraq and the War in Afghanistan. Combat or "in theater" service is not required for membership.

The membership of the Order and the number of state commanderies over the 100 years of the Order's existence has fluctuated, typically increasing after the end of a war and declining during times of peace. The Order's stringent and high eligibility requirements make it difficult for the Order to recruit members in large numbers. However, this selectivity has enabled the Order to sustain itself for over 100 years because it continues to fill its ranks with individuals of the highest caliber, patriotism, loyalty, and character.

== Past Commanders-General ==
- Brevet Major General Alexander S. Webb (1896–1911)
- Major General Charles Francis Roe (1911–14)
- Rear Admiral William B. Caperton (1914–17)
- Brigadier General Samuel W. Fountain (1917–20)
- Rear Admiral Robert E. Coontz (1920–23)
- Major General Clarence R. Edwards (1923–26)
- Captain William S. Bainbridge, MC, USN (1926–32)
- Lieutenant Colonel Pelham St.G. Bissell (1932–38)
- Colonel Philip L. Schuyler (1938–41)
- Colonel William I. Forbes (1941–45)
- Major General John F. O'Ryan (1945–46)
- Colonel James A. Doherty (1946–49)
- Colonel Edwin S. Bettelheirn Jr. (1949–51)
- Brigadier General Joseph H. Lewis (1951–53)
- Major General John Williams Morgan (1953–55)
- Commander Ross H. Currier (1955–57)
- Captain Richard F. Warren, USN (1957–59)
- Lieutenant Benjamin L. Cook Jr., (1959–61)
- Colonel Frederick B. Wiener (1961–63)
- Commander James A. Lamphier, USNR (1963–65)
- Brigadier General William C. Baxter (1965–67)
- Rear Admiral Robert Granville Burke (1967–69)
- Colonel Wilbur J. Myers (1969–71)
- Rear Admiral Theodore C. Aylward (1971–73)
- Colonel R. Graham Bosworth (1973–75)
- Brigadier General Joseph S. Zarieko (1975–77)
- Colonel Richard H. Love (1977–79)
- Colonel John Denny Dale (1979–81)
- Brigadier General William Uriah Ogletree (1981–83)
- Brigadier General Arthur N. Phillips (1983–85)
- Lieutenant Commander T. Johnson Ward, USN (1985–87)
- Major General James C. McElroy (1987–89)
- Commander Thomas F. Wiener, USN (1989–91)
- Colonel Charles H. Bechtold, USMC (1991–93)
- First Lieutenant Charles F. Dale (1993–95)
- Colonel Versel Case Jr. (1995–97)
- Lieutenant Colonel Ronald R. Sommer (1997–99)

== Recent Commanders-General ==
- Colonel Joseph P. Kirlin III, USAR (1999–2001)
- Captain Ronald E. Fischer, AUS (2001–03)
- Major General John J. Salesses, USMCR (2003–05)
- Colonel Duane Bartrem, MIARNG (2005–07)
- Colonel Arthur J. Nattans, MDARNG (2007–09)
- Lieutenant Colonel Lewis L. Neilson Jr., USAR (2009–11)
- Major Wulf Lindenau, USA (2011–13)
- Colonel David H. Russell, RIARNG (2013–15)
- Captain Richard A. Coutermarsh, USAR (2 May 2015 until resigned on 1 September 2015)
- Lieutenant Colonel Orfeo "Chuck" Trombetta Jr., USAR (1 September 2015 to 3 April 2018)
- Lieutenant Colonel Kent A. D. Clark, USA (3 April 2018 to 4 May 2019)
- Colonel Christopher V. Herndon, USA (4 May 2019 to 29 May 2021)
- Lieutenant Commander Christopher Saint Victor-de Pinho, USN (29 May 2021 – May 2023)
- Colonel Thomas Pike (2025 - Present)

== Notable companions ==
Note – The rank listed is the highest held by that individual in their career.

=== Veteran Companions ===
United States Army

- Colonel Theodore Roosevelt, USV – Hero of the Battle of San Juan Hill, posthumous Medal of Honor recipient and President of the United States.
- General of the Army Dwight D. Eisenhower – Army Chief of Staff, Supreme Allied Commander in Europe and President of the United States.
- General of the Armies John J. Pershing – Commander of the American Expeditionary Force and Army Chief of Staff.
- General of the Army Douglas MacArthur – Medal of Honor recipient, Army Chief of Staff, Commander Southwest Pacific Area and United Nations Commander during the Korean War.
- General Tasker H. Bliss – Army Chief of Staff.
- General Alexander Haig – NATO Supreme Allied Commander Europe and Secretary of State.
- General John L. Hines – Army Chief of Staff.
- Lieutenant General Stanley H. Ford
- Lieutenant General Nelson A. Miles – Commanding General of the United States Army and Medal of Honor recipient.
- Lieutenant General Samuel B. M. Young – First U.S. Army Chief of Staff.
- Major General Thomas M. Anderson – Nephew of Brigadier General Robert Anderson.
- Major General Christopher C. Augur – Mexican War Veteran and Civil War general.
- Major General Frank Baldwin – Two time Medal of Honor recipient.
- Major General Joseph Cabell Breckinridge Sr. – Veteran of the Civil War and the Spanish–American War.
- Major General John R. Brooke – Commander of Puerto Rican Expedition in Spanish–American War.
- Major General Matthew C. Butler – Served as major general in the Confederate Army during the American Civil War and in the United States Army during the Spanish–American War.
- Major General Reginald A. Centracchio – Former Adjutant General of Rhode Island.
- Major General John Clem – Youngest Union soldier in the American Civil War.
- Major General George Whitefield Davis – Spanish–American War veteran.
- Major General George W. Getty – Mexican War Veteran and American Civil War Union general.
- Major General William Montrose Graham Jr. – Veteran of the Civil War and Spanish–American War.
- Major General Frederick D. Grant – Son of General and President Ulysses S. Grant.
- Major General Francis V. Greene – Spanish–American War veteran.
- Major General Mark L. Hersey – Veteran of the Spanish–American War and commanded the 4th Division during the First World War.
- Major General Leonard Holland - World War II Veteran and Adjutant General of Rhode Island.
- Major General John W. Kiely - World War II Veteran and Adjutant General of Rhode Island.
- Major General William August Kobbé – Veteran of the Civil War, Spanish–American War and Philippine Insurrection.
- Major General Wesley Merritt – Military Governor of the Philippines.
- Major General Paul B. Malone – General in First World War.
- Major General James S. Negley – Veteran of the Mexican War and the Civil War.
- Major General John F. O'Ryan – Commander of 27th Division in the First World War.
- Major General Fitz John Porter – Mexican War and Civil War Veteran.
- Major General William R. Shafter – Commander of V Corps in Cuba during the Spanish–American War.
- Major General William Farrar Smith – Mexican War and Civil War Veteran.
- Major General David S. Stanley – Medal of Honor recipient.
- Major General Samuel S. Sumner – Cavalry brigade commander at the Battle of San Juan Hill.
- Major General Joseph Wheeler – Lieutenant general in the Confederate States Army and division commander at Battle of San Juan Hill.
- Brevet Major General George W. Getty – Mexican War and Civil War Veteran.
- Brevet Major General John P. Hatch – Mexican War and Civil War veteran and Medal of Honor recipient.
- Brevet Major General Albion P. Howe – Mexican War and Civil War Veteran.
- Brevet Major General Zealous B. Tower – Mexican War Veteran and Civil War general.
- Brigadier General Adelbert Ames – Medal of Honor recipient, Governor of Mississippi, United States Senator, Civil War and Spanish–American War Veteran.
- Brigadier General Rick Baccus – Commander of Joint Task Force 160.
- Brigadier General Richard C. Drum – Adjutant General of the United States Army.
- Brigadier General Harry C. Egbert – Veteran of the Mexican War, Spanish–American War and Philippine Insurrection.
- Brigadier General Samuel W. Fountain – Veteran of the Civil War and Spanish–American War.
- Brigadier General Charles C. Gilbert
- Brigadier General Webb C. Hayes – Medal of Honor recipient and son of President Rutherford B. Hayes.
- Brigadier General Philip W. Kearny – Son of Major General Philip Kearny.
- Brigadier General John Brown Kerr – Medal of Honor recipient.
- Brigadier General Marion Maus – Medal of Honor recipient.
- Brigadier General William J. McKee
- Brigadier General Billy Mitchell – Outspoken air power advocate.
- Brigadier General John H. Parker – recipient of four Distinguished Service Crosses.
- Brigadier General Alexander C. M. Pennington – Career Army officer.
- Brigadier General Charles Foster Tillinghast Sr. – Veteran of the Spanish–American War and World War I.
- Colonel Jacob G. Frick – Mexican War veteran and Medal of Honor recipient.
- Colonel Edwin Meese, USAR – Attorney General of the United States.
- Colonel Lewis L. Millett – Medal of Honor recipient and veteran of World War II, Korea and Vietnam.
- Lieutenant Colonel John Jacob Astor IV – Reputed wealthiest man in the United States when he died on the RMS Titanic in 1912.
- Lieutenant Colonel William H. H. Benyaurd – Medal of Honor recipient.
- Major John Alexander Logan Jr. – Medal of Honor recipient.
- Major Louis Livingston Lorillard - Socialite and philanthropist.
- Major Barclay Harding Warburton I – Veteran of the Spanish-American War and aide to General John J. Pershing.
- Captain Woodbury Kane – Socialite and member of Roosevelt's Rough Riders.
- Captain Norman S. Case - Governor of Rhode Island.
- Captain Richard A. Coutermarsh – Distinguished Member of the 9th Infantry Regiment, as conferred by the Secretary of the United States Army.
- Captain Frank J. Williams – Retired Chief Justice of the Rhode Island Supreme Court.
- Brevet Captain Gustavus W. Smith – Mexican War veteran and major general in the Confederate States Army.
- 1st Lieutenant Richard B. Abell – Retired United States Claims Court judge.
- Ensign Dyer Pierce – Veteran of the War of 1812.

United States Navy

- Admiral of the Navy George Dewey – Hero of the Battle of Manila Bay.
- Fleet Admiral William Halsey – Commander of the 3rd Fleet in Second World War.
- Admiral William B. Caperton – Commander of the Pacific Fleet during the First World War.
- Admiral Robert E. Coontz – Chief of Naval Operations.
- Admiral Cameron McRae Winslow – Commanded cable cutting operation in Cuba.
- Vice Admiral John Benjamin Totushek, USNR – Commander of the Naval Reserve Force.
- Rear Admiral George Balch – Superintendent of the United States Naval Academy.
- Rear Admiral Reginald R. Belknap – Commander of the North Sea Mine Barrage in First World War.
- Rear Admiral Daniel L. Braine – Veteran of the Mexican War and the Civil War.
- Rear Admiral William G. Buehler – Veteran of the Civil War and the Spanish-American War.
- Rear Admiral Charles Edgar Clark – Captain of the battleship USS Oregon during the Spanish-American War.
- Rear Admiral George Partridge Colvocoresses – Veteran of the Battle of Manila Bay.
- Rear Admiral Joseph Coghlan – Commanded the cruiser USS Raleigh (C-8) at the Battle of Manila Bay.
- Rear Admiral Francis A. Cook – Veteran of the Battle of Mobile Bay and commander of the cruiser USS Brooklyn at the Battle of Santiago de Cuba.
- Rear Admiral Peirce Crosby – Veteran of the Mexican War.
- Rear Admiral Franck Taylor Evans - Veteran of the Battle of Santiago de Cuba in the Spanish-American War and also of World War I.
- Rear Admiral Robley D. Evans - Veteran of the Civil War and the Spanish American War and commander of the Great White Fleet.
- Rear Admiral William M. Folger – Commander of the United States Asiatic Fleet.
- Rear Admiral Bancroft Gherardi – Veteran of the Battle of Mobile Bay.
- Rear Admiral Henry Glass – Led capture of Guam during the Spanish–American War.
- Rear Admiral Caspar F. Goodrich – President of the Naval War College.
- Rear Admiral John Irwin - Veteran of the Mexican War and the Civil War.
- Rear Admiral Richmond P. Hobson – Medal of Honor recipient.
- Rear Admiral Austin Melvin Knight – President of the Naval War College.
- Rear Admiral Stephen B. Luce – Founder of the United States Naval War College.
- Rear Admiral Bowman H. McCalla – Led capture of Guantánamo Bay, Cuba.
- Rear Admiral William T. Sampson – Leader of the Naval Campaign in Cuba.
- Rear Admiral Winfield Scott Schley – Hero the Battle of Santiago de Cuba.
- Rear Admiral Thomas O. Selfridge – Veteran of the Siege of Veracruz.
- Rear Admiral Thomas O. Selfridge Jr. – Veteran of the Mexican War and the Civil War.
- Rear Admiral Charles D. Sigsbee – Captain of the armored cruiser USS Maine.
- Rear Admiral William T. Swinburne – Commander of the Pacific Fleet.
- Rear Admiral John Henry Russell – Civil War veteran.
- Rear Admiral John C. Watson – Commander of the Asiatic Squadron.
- Rear Admiral John L. Worden – Commanding officer of the USS Monitor.
- Commodore Oscar C. Badger – Veteran of the Mexican War and the Civil War.
- Captain Alfred Brooks Fry, USNR – Marine and civil engineer, commodore of the New York Naval Militia.
- Captain William F. Halsey Sr. – Father of Fleet Admiral William F. Halsey Jr.
- Captain William Henry Vanderbilt III - Naval Cadet in World War I, World War II veteran and Governor of Rhode Island.
- Lieutenant Commander Dennis J. Roberts - Office of Strategic Services in World War II, later Governor of Rhode Island.
- Lieutenant Commander John Philip Sousa, USNR – Legendary band leader.

United States Marine Corps

- Lieutenant General Dennis McCarthy, USMC
- Lieutenant General John Twiggs Myers, USMC – Recipient of the Brevet Medal.
- Major General George Barnett, USMC – Commandant of the United States Marine Corps.
- Major General Smedley Butler, USMC – Two time Medal of Honor recipient.
- Major General George F. Elliott, USMC – Commandant of the Marine Corps.
- Major General John J. Salesses, USMCR – Dean of Graduate Studies at Rhode Island College.
- Major General Littleton Waller, USMC – Veteran of the Spanish–American War, Philippine Insurrection and First World War.
- Brigadier General Henry Clay Cochrane, USMC – Veteran of the Civil War and the Spanish–American War.
- Brigadier General James Forney, USMC – Veteran of the Civil War and the Spanish–American War.
- Brevet Brigadier General Robert Leamy Meade, USMC – Nephew of Major General George G. Meade.
- Colonel Thomas Y. Field, USMC
- Colonel Robert W. Huntington, USMC – Commanded 1st Marine Battalion during the capture of Guantánamo Bay, Cuba in 1898.
- Captain Bernard Jackvony, USMC – Served in Vietnam and later Lieutenant Governor of Rhode Island.

United States Air Force

- Colonel Bruce Sundlun, USAFR – Army Air Forces in World War II and later Governor of Rhode Island.

=== Hereditary Companions ===
- Governor and Senator Morgan G. Bulkeley – President of Aetna Insurance, Governor of Connecticut and United States Senator.
- Lieutenant Governor William H. Bulkeley – Lieutenant Governor of Connecticut and brigadier general in the Connecticut National Guard.
- The Honorable Amos Madden Thayer – Eighth Circuit Federal Court of Appeals judge.
- Rear Admiral Richard Worsam Meade – Veteran of the Civil War.
- Rear Admiral Thomas O. Selfridge Jr. – Veteran of the Civil War and son of Rear Admiral Thomas O. Selfridge Sr.
- Rear Admiral John Grimes Walker – Descendant of Lieutenant Aaron Walker who served in the American Revolution.
- Brevet Major General Theodore S. Peck – Medal of Honor recipient.
- Brevet Major General Alexander S. Webb – Medal of Honor recipient, Civil War general, signer of the Original Institution of the MOFW in 1894 and first President General of the MOFW.
- Brigadier General (New York National Guard) James M. Varnum – Surrogate of New York County and socialite.
- Brevet Brigadier General Horace Porter – Medal of Honor recipient and United States Ambassador to France.
- Colonel Louis R. Cheney – Mayor of Hartford, Connecticut.
- Lieutenant Colonel Russell Benjamin Harrison – Great Grandson of President and Major General William Henry Harrison. (Also a Veteran Companion who served in the Spanish–American War.)
- Brevet Major Augustus P. Davis – Founder of the Sons of Union Veterans of the Civil War.
- Brevet Major Rufus King Jr. – Medal of Honor recipient and descendant of Major and Senator Rufus King who was a signer of the United States Constitution.
- The Reverend Alexander Hamilton – Direct descendant of Secretary of the Treasury and Major General Alexander Hamilton.

=== Honorary Companions ===
- President and Brevet Brigadier General Benjamin Harrison – Brigade commander in nine battles during the Civil War. (Also eligible to join as an hereditary companion due to his grandfather Major General William Henry Harrison's service in the War of 1812.)
- President and Brevet Major William McKinley – President during the Spanish–American War and breveted for gallantry in action in the Civil War.
- President Grover Cleveland – Purchased a substitute to avoid being drafted during the Civil War. (Also eligible to be an hereditary companion due to the service of his great grandfather, Captain Aaron Cleveland, during the American Revolution.)
- General Barry McCaffrey – Commanded the 24th Infantry Division in Operation Desert Storm and United States Southern Command.
- General John J. Sheehan, USMC – Commander-in-Chief United States Atlantic Command.
- Lieutenant General John M. Schofield – Civil War veteran, Medal of Honor recipient, Commanding General of the United States Army, Superintendent of West Point and Secretary of War.
- Rear Admiral George E. Belknap – Civil War veteran. Commanded monitor USS Canonicus at the Second Battle of Fort Fisher.
- Rear Admiral William S. Cowles – Commander of the Asiatic Fleet and brother in law of President Theodore Roosevelt.
- Rear Admiral Eugene B. Fluckey – World War II submarine commander and Medal of Honor recipient.
- Rear Admiral Thomas H. Stevens Jr. – Civil War veteran. Commanded monitor USS Winnebago at the Battle of Mobile Bay.
- Major General Thomas H. Barry – Spanish–American War veteran and Superintendent of West Point.
- Major General Thomas H. Ruger – Civil War veteran and Superintendent of the United States Military Academy.
- Major General David S. Stanley – Civil War veteran and Medal of Honor recipient.
- Major General Frank Wheaton – Civil War veteran with a total of 42 years of military service.
- Brevet Major General Eugene A. Carr – Civil War veteran and Medal of Honor recipient.
- Colonel William Donald Schaefer, USAR – Governor of Maryland and longtime Mayor of Baltimore.
- Captain Paul Bucha – Vietnam War veteran and Medal of Honor recipient.

== Presidents of the United States ==
Five Presidents of the United States were elected companions (members) of the MOFW. Presidents Theodore Roosevelt and Dwight Eisenhower joined the MOFW as Veteran Companions. Presidents Grover Cleveland, Benjamin Harrison and William McKinley joined the MOFW as honorary companions. (Presidents Harrison and Cleveland could also have joined the MOFW as hereditary companions.)
