= Joseph Coghlan =

United States Navy admiral

Joseph Bullock Coghlan
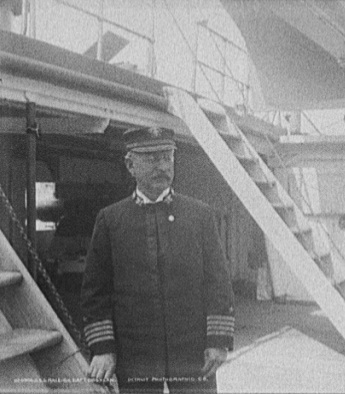
- Coghlan commanding the USS Raleigh, circa 1898
- Born: 9 December 1844; Frankfort, Kentucky
- Died: 5 December 1908 (aged 63); New Rochelle, New York
- Burial place: Arlington National Cemetery
- Military career
- Allegiance: United States of America
- Branch: United States Navy
- Service years: 1863–1907
- Rank: Rear Admiral
- Commands: New York Navy Yard; Raleigh; Department of Alaska; Adams
- Conflicts: American Civil War; Spanish–American War

Rear Admiral Joseph Bullock Coghlan (9 December 1844 – 5 December 1908) was an officer in the United States Navy during the American Civil War and the Spanish–American War.

== Biography ==
Born at Frankfort, Kentucky, to Cornelius and Lavinia Coghlan, and raised in Illinois, Coghlan graduated from the Naval Academy in 1863. He served in the sloop-of-war Sacramento during the Civil War. As commander of the screw sloop Adams, Coghlan was military commander of the Department of Alaska from 15 September 1883 to 13 September 1884. During the Spanish–American War he led the expedition which captured the batteries at Cavite (2 May 1898) and at Isla Grande, Subic Bay (7 July) and commanded the protected cruiser Raleigh during the Battle of Manila Bay on 1 May 1898.

Coghlan was promoted to rear admiral on 11 April 1902. He commanded American forces at Colón, Panama during the separation of Panama from Colombia in 1903. Coghlan served as commandant of the New York Navy Yard from 1 October 1904 to 30 May 1907.

He was a Companion of the Military Order of the Loyal Legion of the United States and the Military Order of Foreign Wars.

After retirement, Coghlan served as president of the Debenture Corporation on Wall Street in New York City. On 31 October 1908, he served as Grand Marshal of a parade of 90,000 businessmen in support of Republican candidates William Howard Taft and James S. Sherman. Less than two months later, Coghlan died in the Sutton Manor district of New Rochelle, New York, and was buried at Arlington National Cemetery.

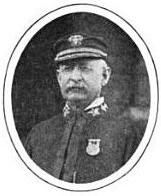

== Namesakes ==
Two ships have been named USS Coghlan in his honor.
