= USS Selfridge (DD-320) =

Clemson-class destroyer

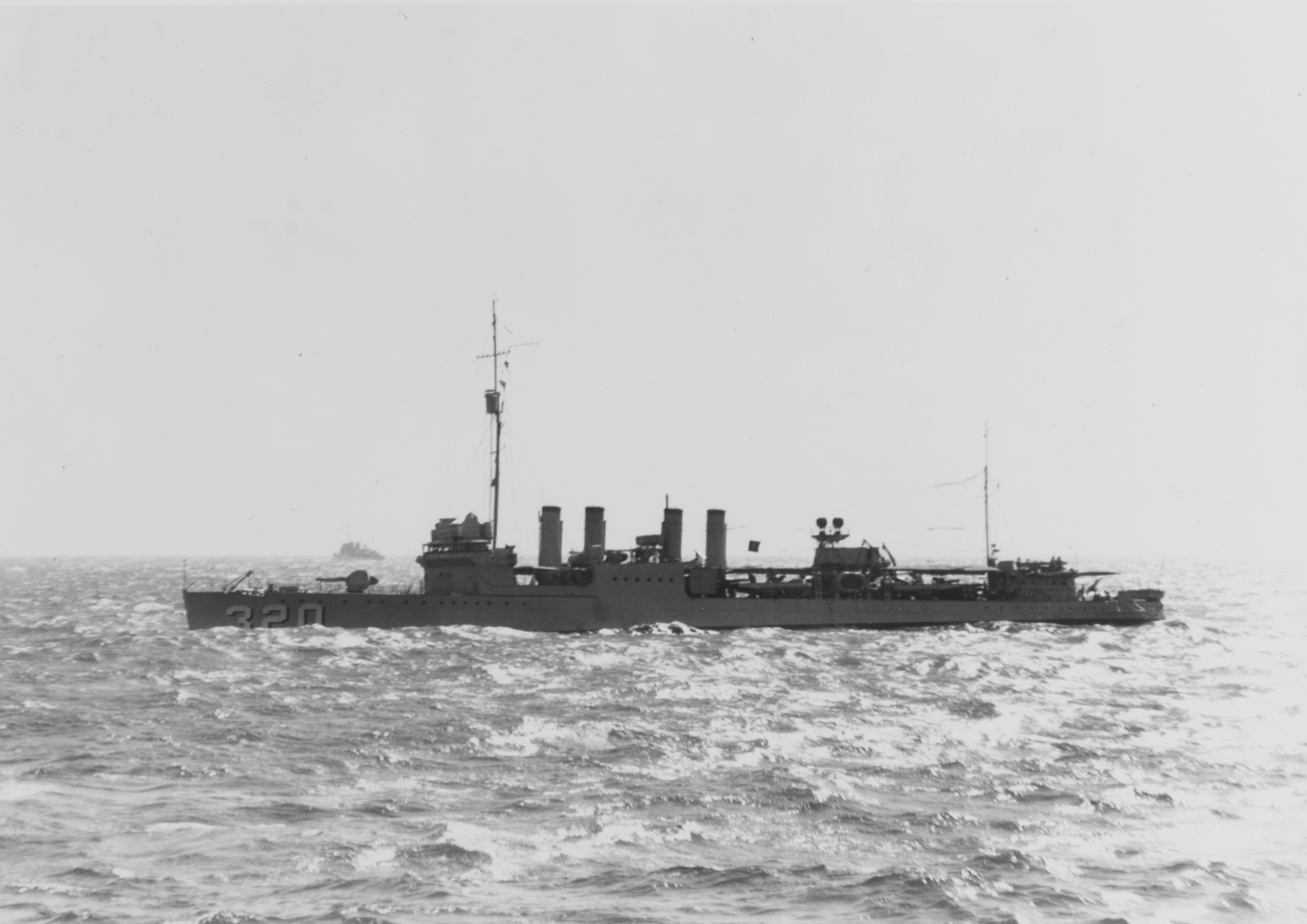

History

United States
- Namesake: Thomas O. Selfridge
- Builder: Bethlehem Shipbuilding Corporation, Union Iron Works, San Francisco
- Laid down: 28 April 1919
- Launched: 10 July 1919
- Commissioned: 7 February 1921
- Decommissioned: 18 March 1930
- Stricken: 3 November 1930
- Fate: Sold for scrap, 31 October 1930

General characteristics
- Class & type: Clemson-class destroyer
- Displacement: 1,190 tons
- Length: 314 feet 5 inches (95.83 m)
- Beam: 31 feet 8 inches (9.65 m)
- Draft: 9 feet 10 inches (3.00 m)
- Propulsion: 26,500 shp (20 MW); geared turbines, 2 screws
- Speed: 35 knots (65 km/h)
- Range: 4,900 nmi (9,100 km); @ 15 kt
- Complement: 122 officers and enlisted
- Armament: 4 × 4 in (102 mm)/50 guns, 12 × 21 inch (533 mm) torpedo tubes

USS Selfridge (DD-320) was a Clemson-class destroyer in service with the United States Navy from 1921 to 1930. She was scrapped in 1931. She was the first ship named Selfridge, the second being a Porter-class destroyer that served in World War II.

== History ==
Selfridge was named for Thomas O. Selfridge. She was laid down on 28 April 1919 by the Bethlehem Shipbuilding Corporation, San Francisco, California; launched on 25 July 1919; sponsored by Mrs. Katharine Kellond, granddaughter of Rear Admiral Selfridge; and commissioned on 17 February 1921.

Selfridge arrived at her home port, San Diego, California, on 16 March 1921 and remained there until June 1922, when she proceeded to the Puget Sound area for exercises with the fleet. She returned to San Diego on 12 September for further training. On 6 February 1923, she sailed with the Battle Fleet for the Panama Canal Zone and conducted exercises there from 26 February to 31 March before returning to San Diego on 11 April. She then underwent overhaul at the Mare Island Navy Yard from 30 May to 16 July and rejoined the fleet for summer exercises off Washington. On 10 September, she returned to San Pedro, having rescued en route survivors of SS Cuba which had been wrecked on San Miguel Island on 8 September.

On 2 January 1924, Selfridge departed San Diego with the Battle Fleet and participated in exercises in the Caribbean with the United States Fleet from 17 January to 6 April. Returning to San Diego on 22 April, she departed on 25 June for exercises off Puget Sound. She was overhauled at Mare Island between 5 August and 1 October and returned to San Diego on 2 October.

Selfridge departed San Diego on 1 April 1925 with the fleet and arrived at Pearl Harbor on 27 April for exercises. Departing on 25 June, she underwent overhaul at Bremerton from 9 August to 3 October and returned to San Diego on 6 October.

On 1 February 1926, Selfridge sailed from San Diego with the Battle Fleet and participated in exercises off Panama before returning to San Diego on 1 April. She arrived in the Puget Sound area on 10 July 1926 and, after receiving repairs at Mare Island from 9 August to 22 September, returned to San Diego on 24 September. In February 1927, she again sailed for the Canal Zone with the fleet and, after transiting the canal on 4 March, conducted exercises in the Caribbean until 22 April. With the fleet, she then visited New York and participated in a joint Army-Navy exercise in Narragansett Bay before arriving at Hampton Roads on 29 May for a Presidential Review. She was then assigned duty with the Special Service Squadron protecting lives and property of United States and other foreign citizens in Nicaragua and helping peacekeeping operations. She also carried out two patrols off that country, from 18 June to 2 July and 16 to 26 July. She then proceeded to Mare Island, underwent overhaul there, and returned to San Diego on 30 September.

Selfridge departed San Diego on 9 April 1928 and, after conducting Fleet Problem VIII with the fleet en route, arrived at Pearl Harbor on 28 April. She returned to San Diego on 23 June and, after a two-week training cruise to Honolulu, underwent overhaul at Mare Island from 26 July to 19 September. She resumed exercises at San Diego and, between 27 January and 11 March 1929, participated in the fleet concentration off Panama.

== Fate ==
She returned to San Diego on 22 March 1929 and was decommissioned there on 8 February 1930. Selfridge was struck from the Navy list on 3 November 1930, scrapped at the Mare Island Navy Yard, and her hulk was sold on 2 September 1931 to Marine Salvage Company, Oakland, California.
