= Ikeshima =

Largely abandoned island in Japan

Coordinates: 32°53′1.8″N 129°35′44.9″E

Ikeshima 池島
- Island
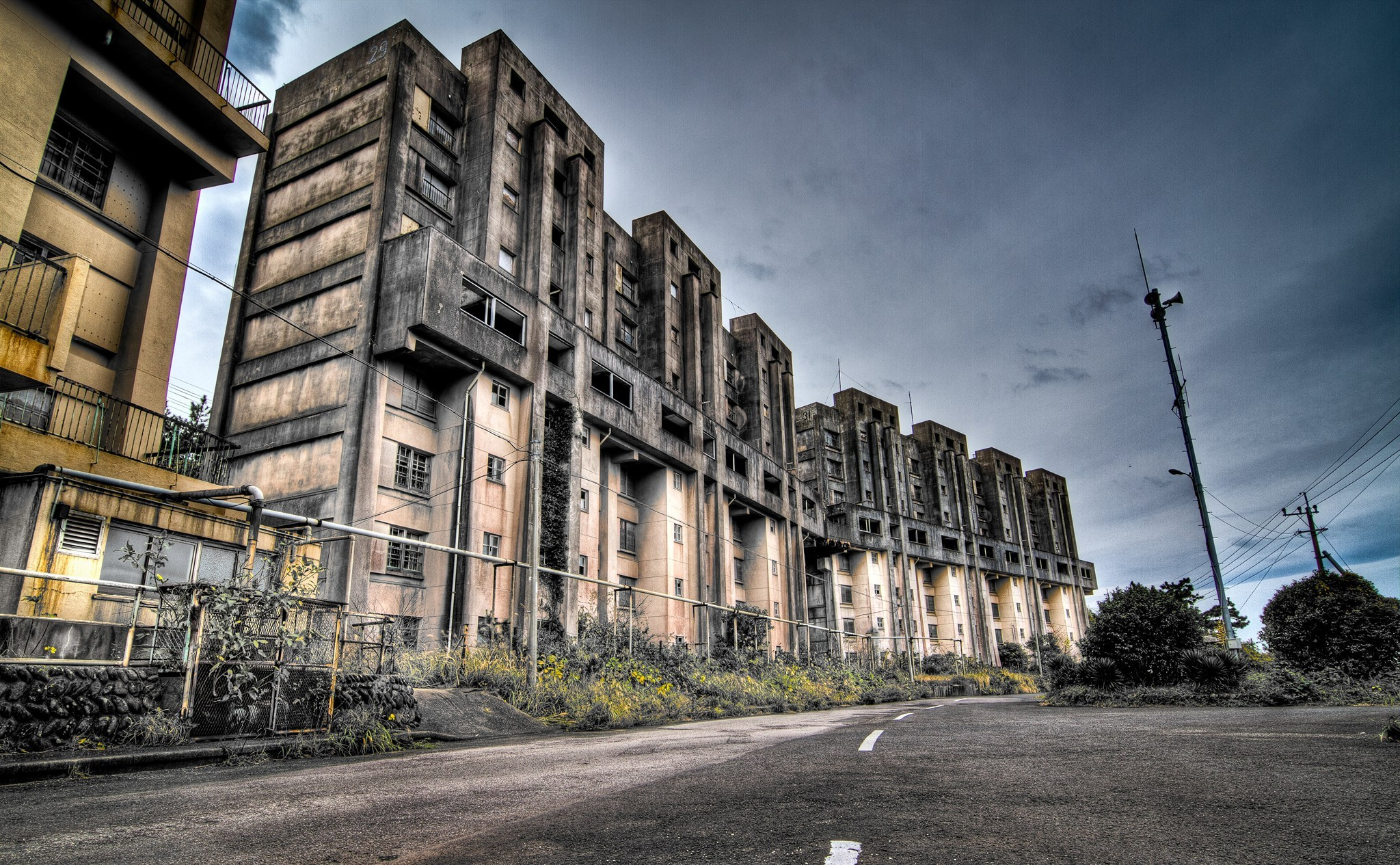
- Abandoned apartment buildings on Ikeshima

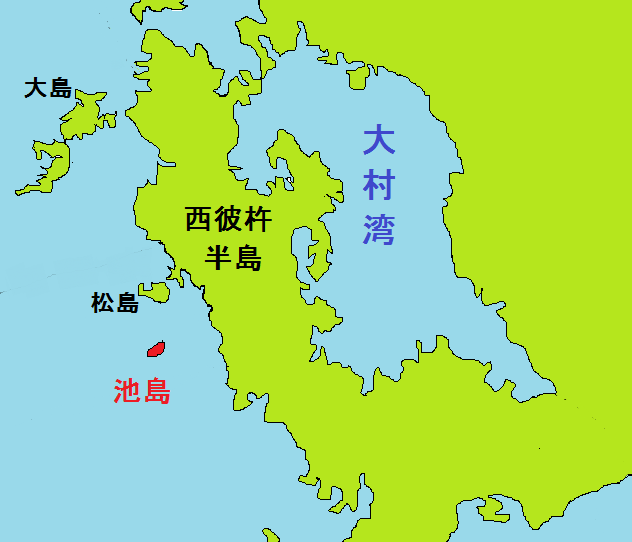
- Country: Japan
- Region: Kyushu
- Prefecture: Nagasaki
- City: Nagasaki

Area
  - Total: 1.08 km^{2} (0.42 sq mi)

Population (2021)
  - Total: 111

Ikeshima or Ikejima (Japanese: 池島), also sometimes listed as Ike Island, is an island in Nagasaki Prefecture, Japan. Initially within the borders of Kamiura village, from 1955 until its merger with the city of Nagasaki in 2005, it was part of Sotome municipality.

Thousands of coal miners who lived on the island were formerly employed there, representing the vast majority of its population. The coal mines opened in 1959 and closed in 2001. The number of miners was reported to be 8,000, or over 10,000 at its peak. As of 2021, only 111 individuals, mostly retired miners or their relatives, remained on the island. Since the coal mining facilities and miners’ residences are still largely preserved, it is also known as the “second Gunkanjima.”

== Etymology ==
The island is named after the former pond on the island, named Kagamigaike. The pond was destroyed in favour of turning it into a port. "Ike" (Japanese: 池) translates to pond, so a literal translation for Ikeshima would be "Pond Island".

== Gallery ==
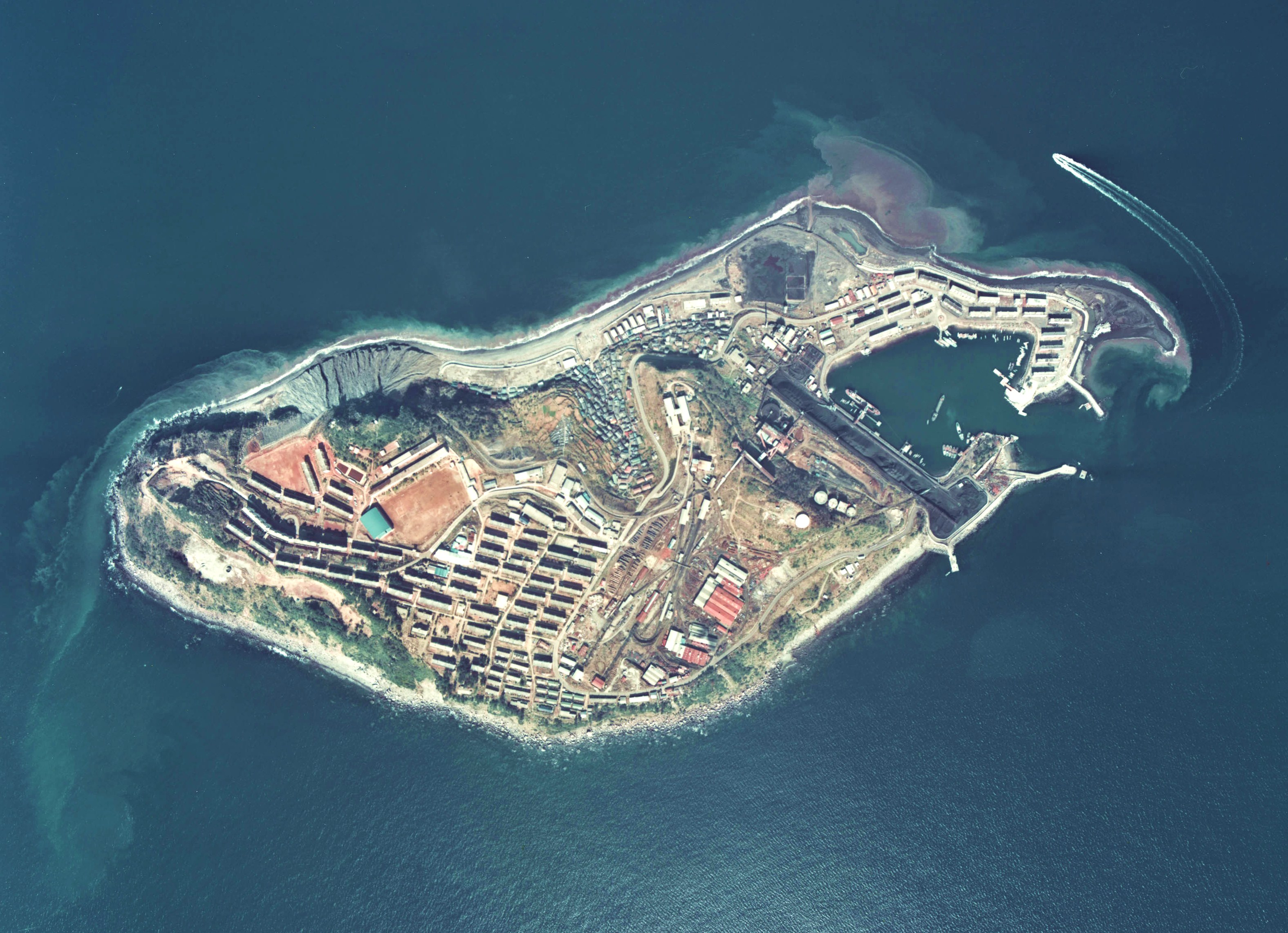
Ikeshima from above

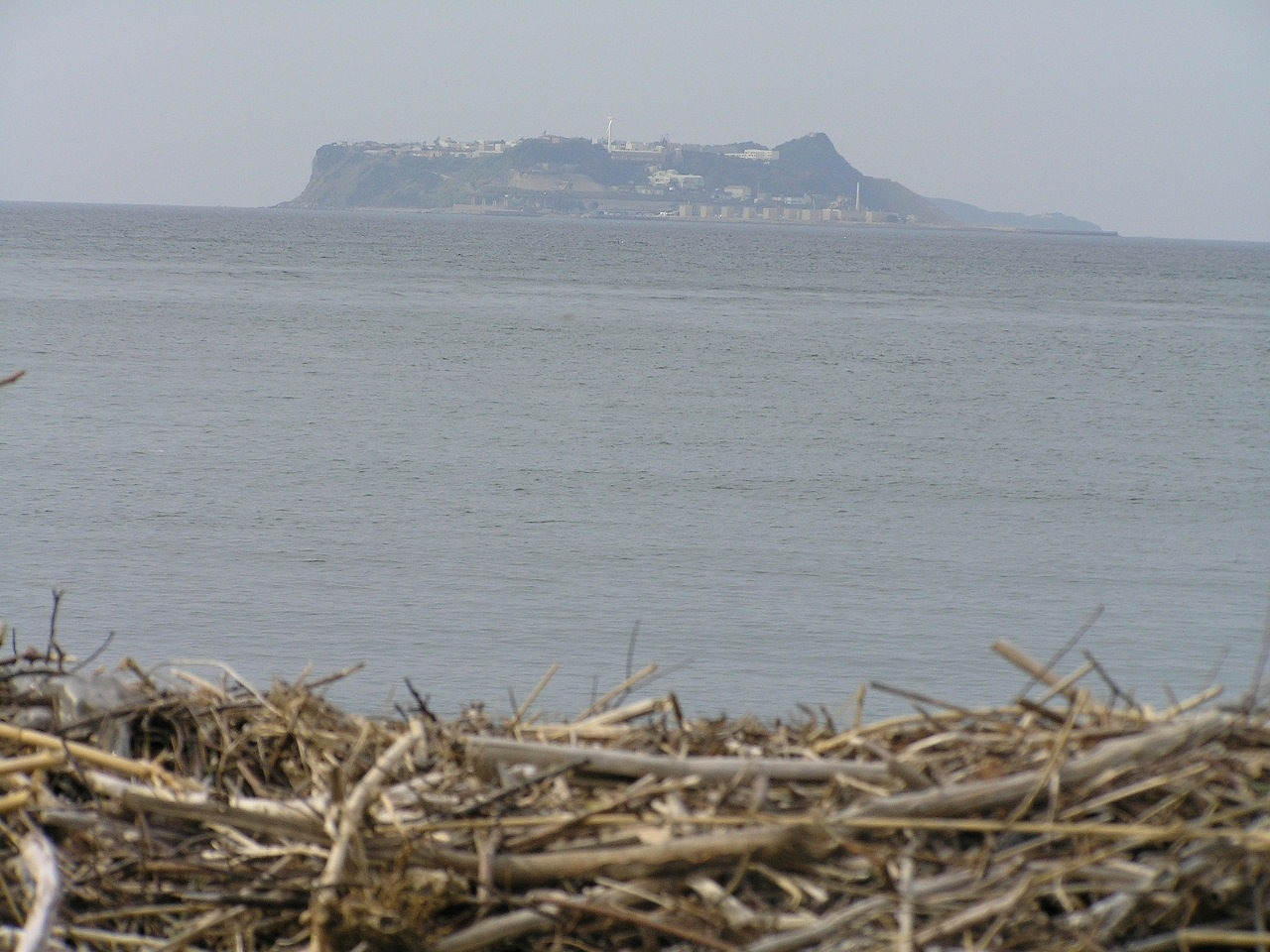
View of Ikeshima from the Nagasaki coastline

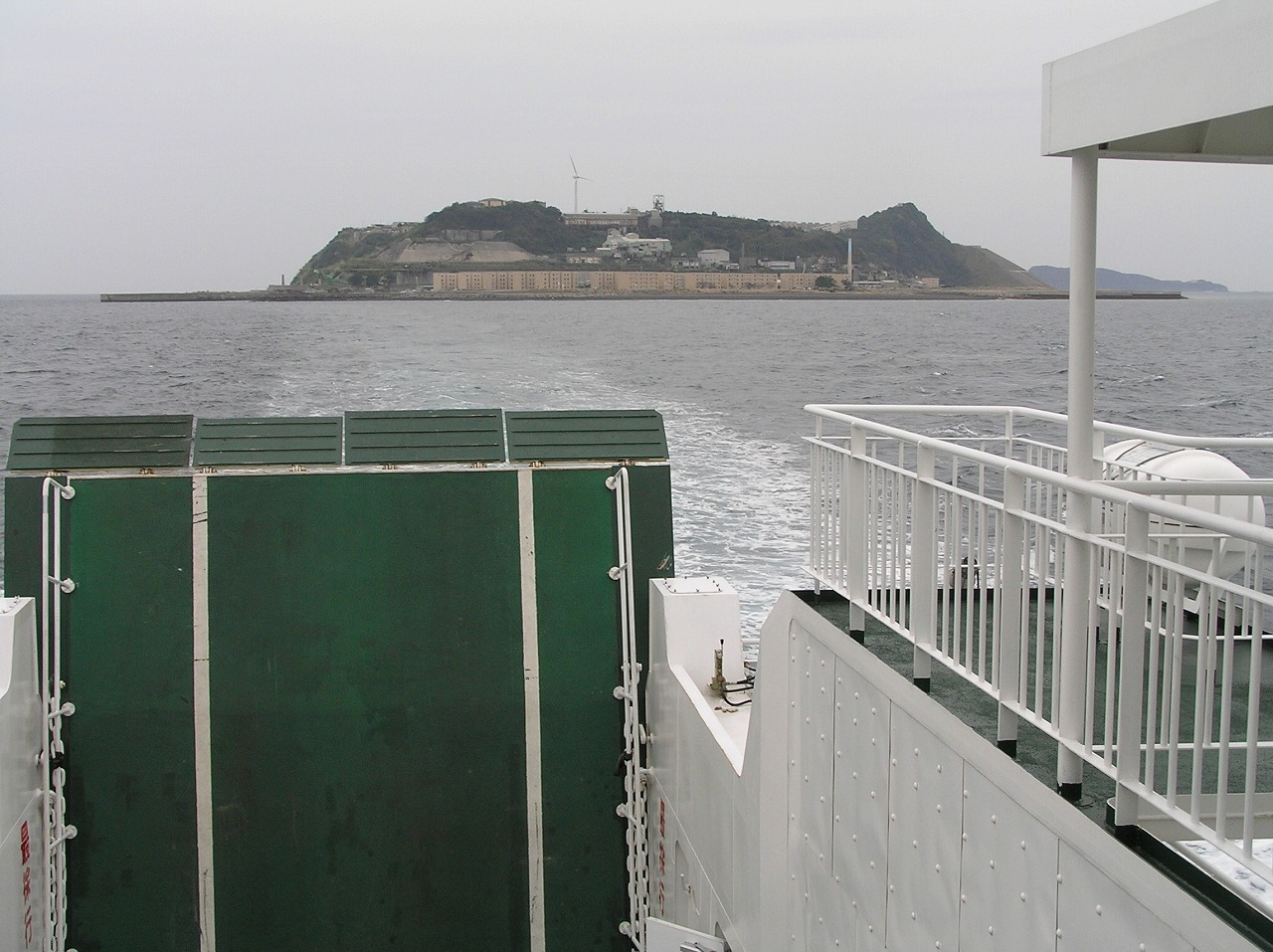
View of Ikeshima from the islands ferry service

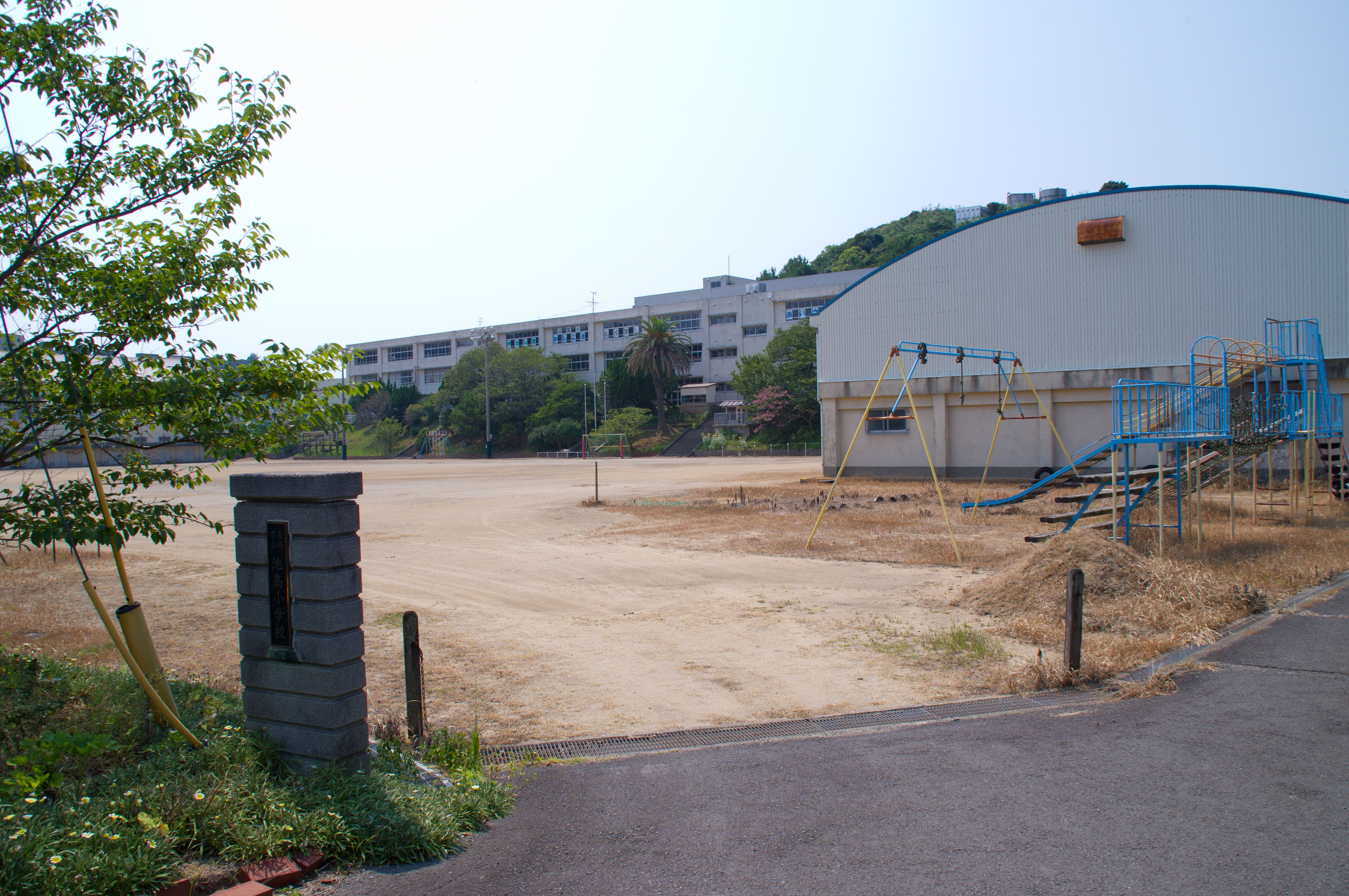
Ikeshima Elementary School

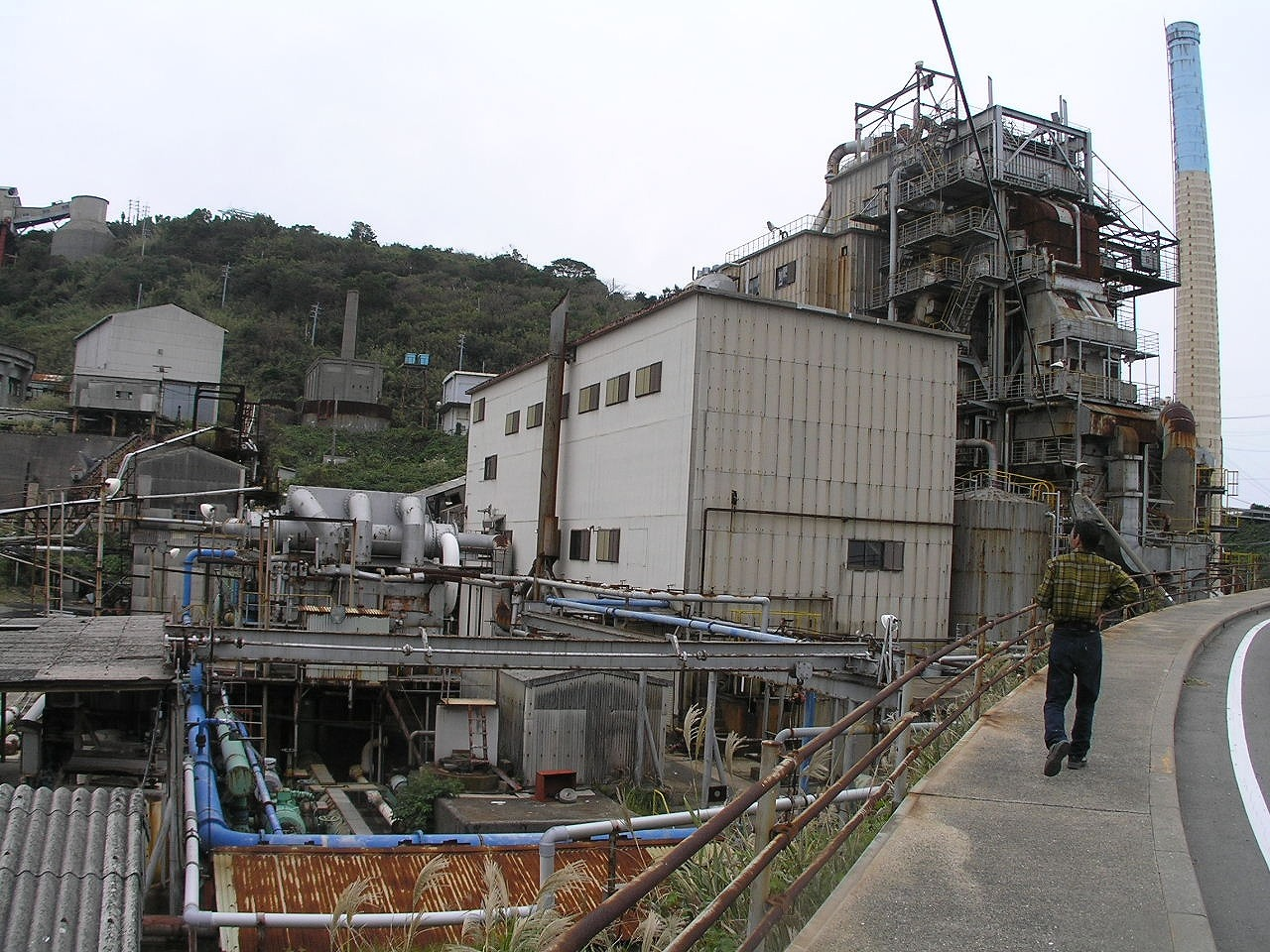
Abandoned coal mining facilities

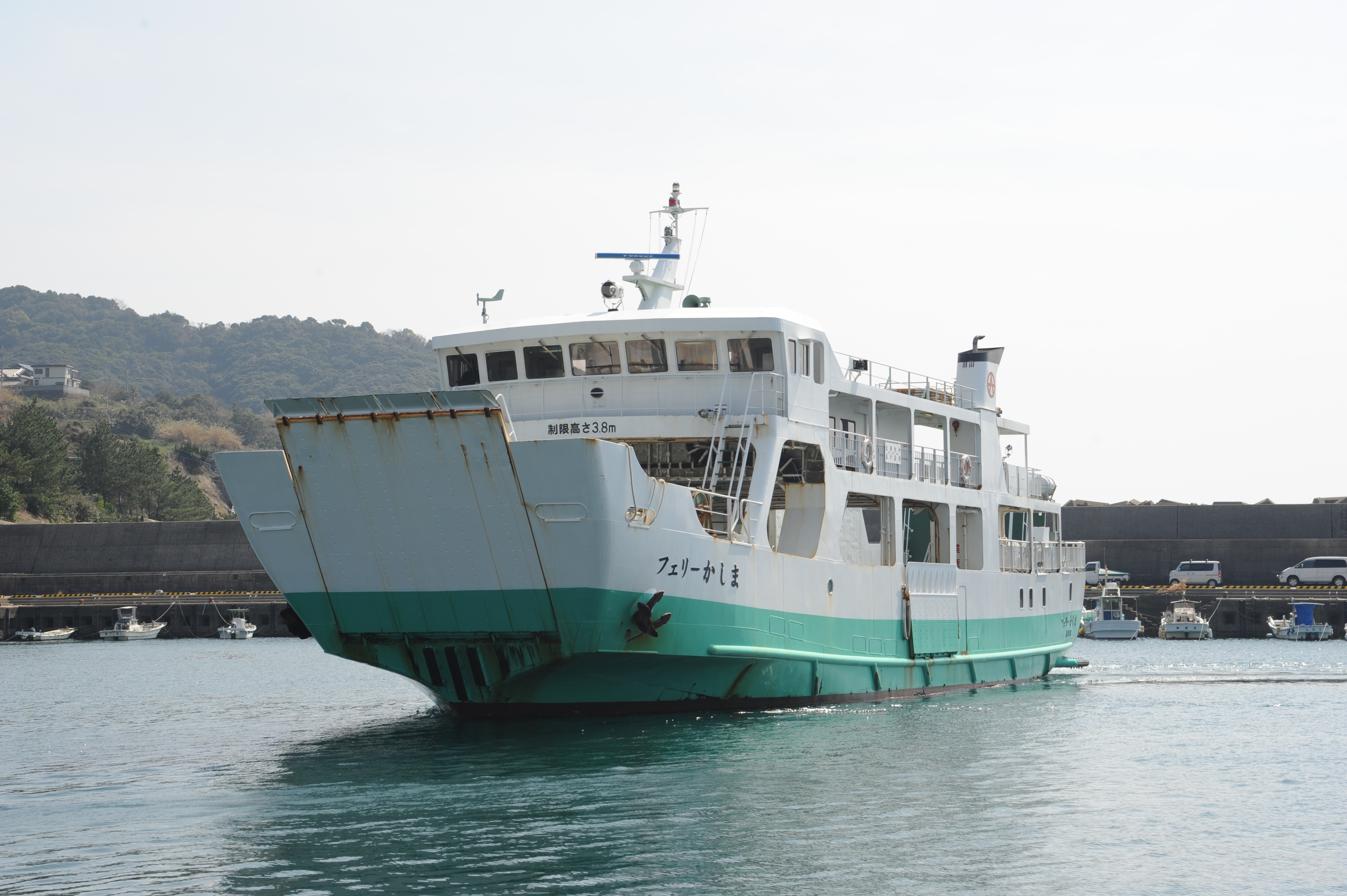
Ikeshima ferry

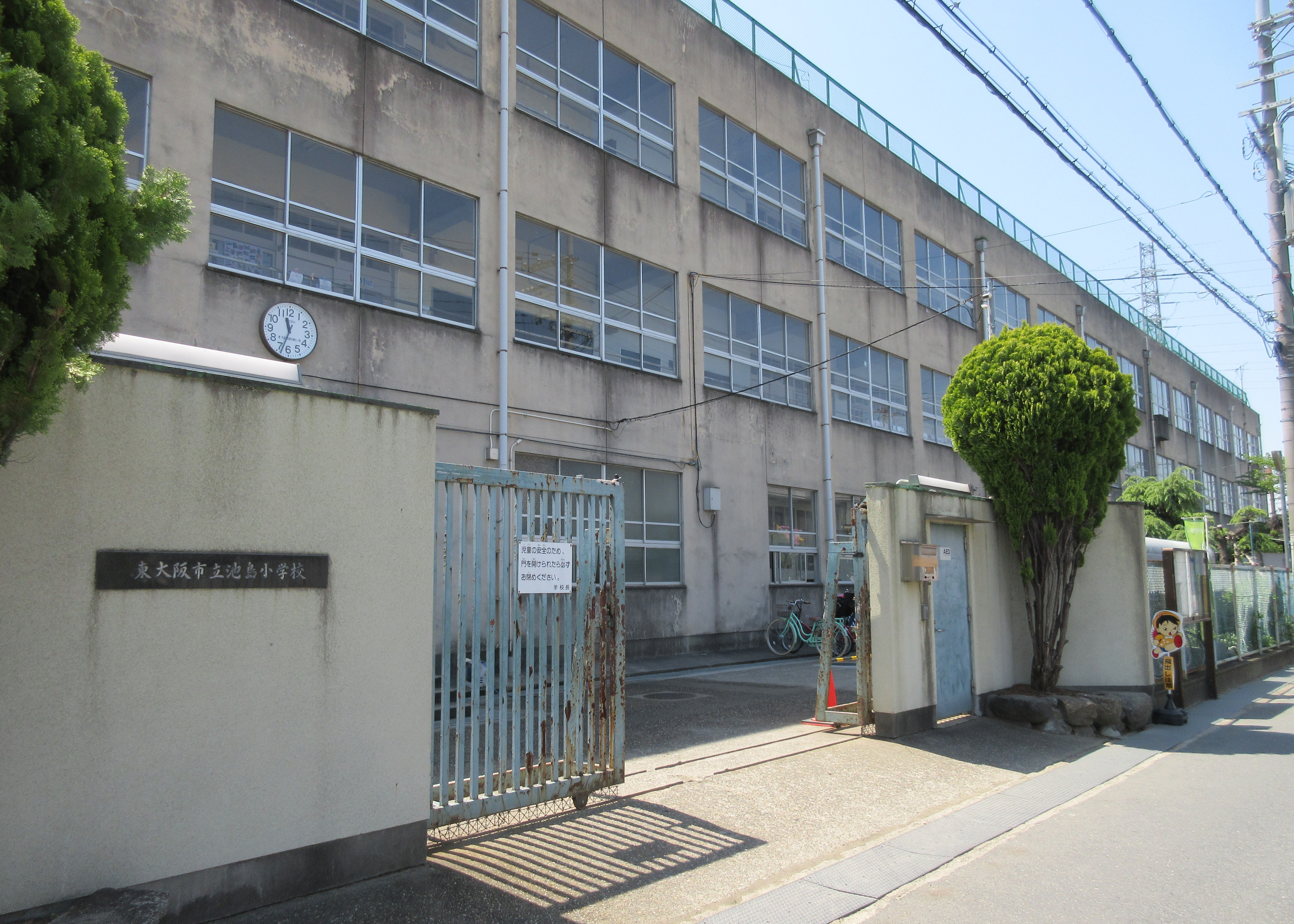
Ikeshima Elementary

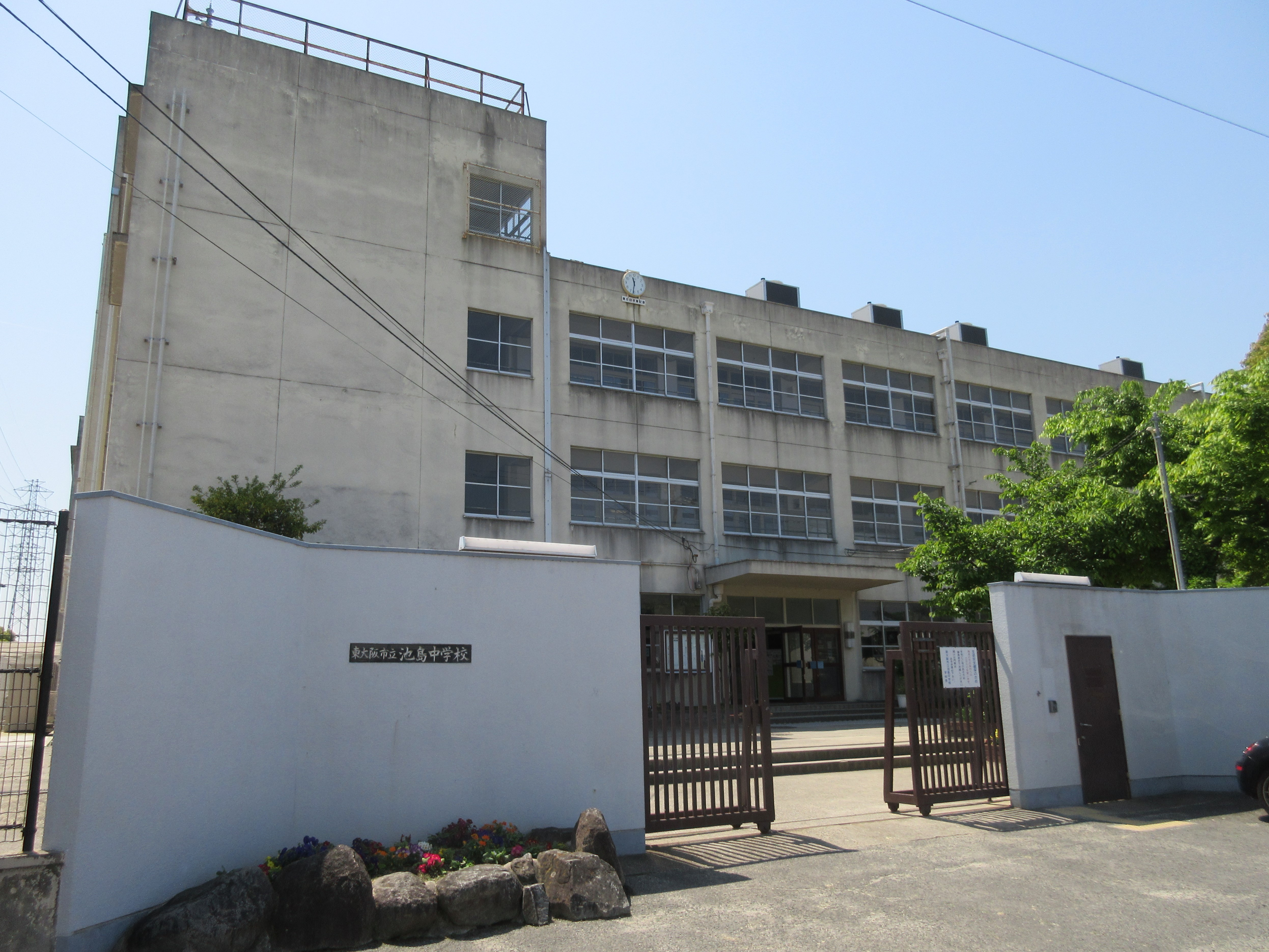
Ikeshima Junior High School

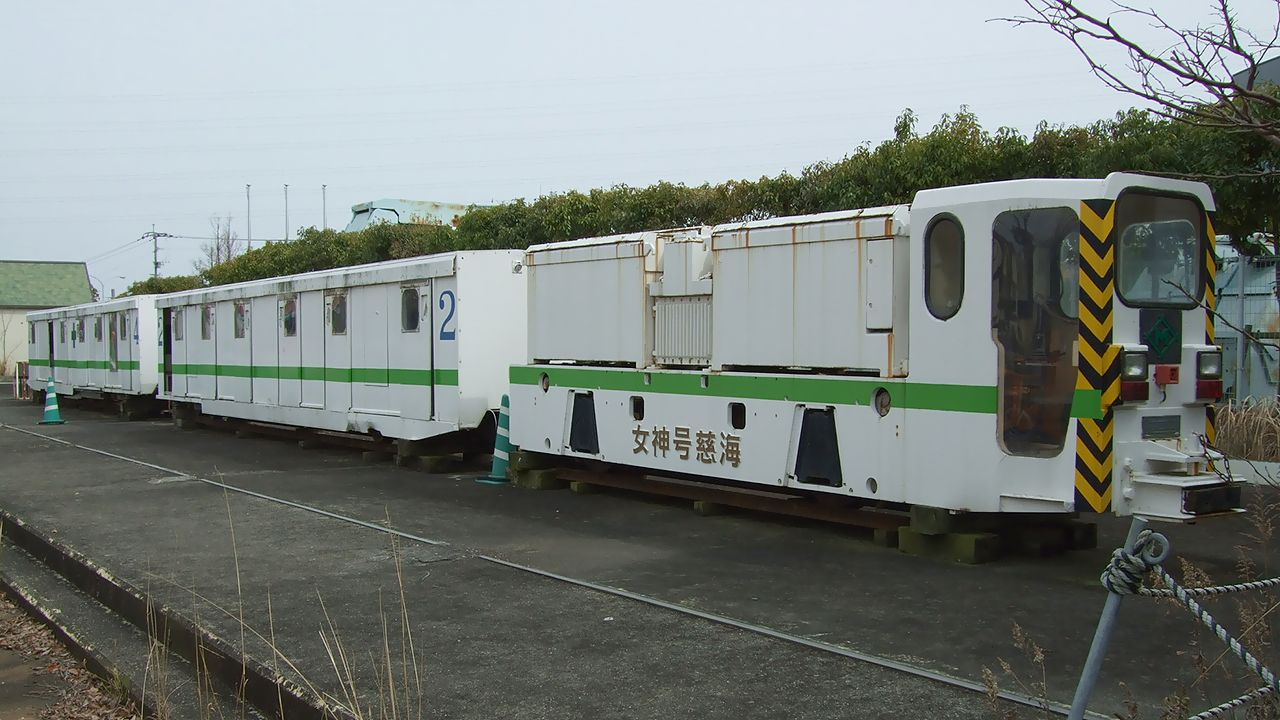
Abandoned coal mine car
