= José Ignacio =

José Ignacio may refer to:

== Places ==
- José Ignacio, Uruguay, a resort (balneario) in the Maldonado Department of southeastern Uruguay
  - Faro de José Ignacio, a lighthouse in the same location.
- Laguna José Ignacio, a body of water located in Maldonado Department, Uruguay

== People ==
- José Ignacio (footballer, born 1973), Spanish footballer
- José Ignacio Abadal (died 2010), Spanish actor
- José Ignacio Borrero (1921–2004), Colombian ornithologist
- José Ignacio Bugarín (born 1968), Spanish rower
- José Ignacio Cabrujas (1937–1995), Venezuelan writer and director
- José Ignacio Cárdenass (1874–1949), Venezuelan physician and diplomat
- José Ignacio Castillo (born 1975), Argentine footballer
- José Ignacio Ceniceros (born 1956), Spanish politician
- José Ignacio Rubio Chávez (born 1954), Mexican politician
- José Ignacio Cienfuegos (1762–1847), Chilean priest, bishop, and political figure
- José Ignacio Cubero (born 1974), Basque lawyer and law professor
- José Ignacio de Cavero y Cárdenas (1757–1834), New Spain and Colombian lawyer and politician
- José Ignacio de Gorriti (1770–1835), Argentine statesman, soldier and lawyer
- José Ignacio de Márquez (1793–1880), Colombian statesman, lawyer and professor
- José Ignacio de Mendiguren (born 1950), Argentine industrialist and politician
- José Ignacio de Sanjinés (1786–1864), Bolivian poet and legislator
- José Ignacio Díaz (born 1979), Spanish racewalker
- José Ignacio Echeverría (born 1946), Spanish politician
- José Ignacio Fernández (disambiguation), several people
- José Ignacio Sánchez Galán (born 1950), Spanish businessman
- José Ignacio Garmendia (born 1960), Spanish footballer
- José Ignacio Goirigolzarri (born 1954), Spanish economist and executive
- José Ignacio Gutiérrez (born 1977), Spanish cyclist
- José Ignacio García Hamilton (1943–2009), Argentine writer, historian, lawyer and politician
- José Ignacio Hualde (fl. 1990s–2020s), Spanish linguist
- José Ignacio Inchausti (born 1973), Spanish rugby union player and coach
- José Ignacio Iruretagoyena (1963–1998), Spanish politician and terrorism victim
- José Ignacio Landaluce (born 1959), Spanish politician
- José Ignacio Pichardo Lechuga (born 1966), Mexican politician
- José Ignacio López (born 1970), Spanish dressage rider
- José Ignacio López de Arriortúa (born 1941), Spanish businessman
- José Ignacio Duarte Murillo (born 1965), Mexican politician
- José Ignacio Paliza (born 1981), politician and lawyer from the Dominican Republic
- José Ignacio Palma (1910–1988), Chilean engineer and politician
- José Ignacio París (1780–1848), hero of independence and businessman from New Granada
- José Ignacio Paua (1872–1926), Chinese-Filipino general
- José Ignacio Pavón (1791–1866), Mexican civil servant and briefly interim President of Mexico
- José Ignacio Peralta (born 1970), Mexican politician
- José Ignacio Pérez Sáenz (born 1951), Spanish politician
- José Ignacio Suárez Peredo y Bezares (born 1834), Mexican clergyman and bishop
- José Ignacio Quintón (1881–1925), Puerto Rican pianist and composer
- José Ignacio Rivero (1920–2011), Cuban exile and journalist
- José Ignacio Rodríguez (born 1979), Venezuelan model
- José Ignacio Rucci (1924–1973), Argentine politician and union leader
- José Ignacio Salafranca Sánchez-Neyra (born 1955), Spanish politician and diplomat
- José Ignacio López Sanjuán (born 1940), Spanish retired footballer
- José Ignacio Seara Sierra (born 1959), Mexican politician
- José Ignacio Soler (born 1967), Spanish footballer
- José Ignacio Thames (1762–1832), Argentine statesman and priest
- José Ignacio Torreblanca (born 1968), Spanish political analyst and political scientist
- José Ignacio "Papi" Tovar (1922–2007), Colombian singer-songwriter
- José Ignacio Urbieta (1915–1999), Spanish artist, footballer, and manager
- José Ignacio Ustarán (1939–1980), Spanish politician
- José Ignacio Valenzuela (born 1972), Chilean writer and screenwriter
- José Ignacio Wert (born 1950), Spanish politician
- José Ignacio Zapatero (born 1971), Spanish rugby union player
- José Ignacio Zenteno (1786–1847), Chilean soldier and politician
