= List of shipwrecks in November 1888 =

The list of shipwrecks in November 1888 includes ships sunk, foundered, grounded, or otherwise lost during November 1888.

== 1 November ==
List of shipwrecks: 1 November 1888
| Ship | State | Description |
|---|---|---|
| Four Brothers | United Kingdom | The Thames barge was run into by the steamship Medway (United Kingdom) and sank in the River Thames at West Thurrock, Essex with the loss of a crew member. |
| Janes | United Kingdom | The ship departed from Llanelly, Glamorgan for Pont-Audemer, Eure, France. No further trace, reported missing. |
| Jousten | Denmark | The ship departed from Blyth, Northumberland, United Kingdom. No further trace, reported overdue. |
| Visitor | United Kingdom | The ship departed from Seaham, County Durham for Ipswich, Suffolk. No further trace, reported overdue. |

== 2 November ==
List of shipwrecks: 2 November 1888
| Ship | State | Description |
|---|---|---|
| Deutsche Kaiser | Germany | The steamship was driven ashore at Saint Petersburg, Russia. She was on a voyage from Saint Petersburg to Kronstadt, Russia. She was refloated and resumed her voyage. |
| Folsom | United Kingdom | The fishing smack was abandoned off Port Stewart, Wigtownshire. Her crew were rescued by the Port Stewart Lifeboat. |
| Helena | Germany | The brig foundered in the North Sea off Flamborough Head, Yorkshire, United Kingdom. Her crew were rescued. She was being towed from Hull, Yorkshire to Middlesbrough, Yorkshire. |
| Prinz Leopold | Germany | The steamship was driven ashore at Saint Petersburg. She was on a voyage from Saint Petersburg to Kronstadt. She was reflaoted and resumed her voyage. |
| Speed | United Kingdom | The ship was driven ashore on the Black Island, in the Stangford Lough. |
| 30 unnamed vessels | Russia | The lighters were sunk by ice at Saint Petersburg. |

== 3 November ==
List of shipwrecks: 3 November 1888
| Ship | State | Description |
|---|---|---|
| Nor, and Saxmundham | German Empire; United Kingdom | The steamship was run into by the barque Nor in the English Channel 30 nautical miles (56 km) east north east of St. Catherine's Point, Isle of Wight. Saxmundham, on a voyage from Newcastle upon Tyne, Northumberland to Ancona, Italy, sank. Twelve of her 30 crew were reported missing. Ten of her crew took to the jollyboat and were rescued by the schooner Waterbird (United Kingdom). Eight reached shore in a lifeboat. Nor was abandoned. Her crew were rescued by the steamship Shagbrook (United Kingdom). Nor was subsequently taken in tow by HMS Monarch (Royal Navy). She subsequently ran aground on The Shingles, in the Solent and was wrecked. |
| Seagul | United Kingdom | The fishing smack was driven ashore at Sandlemere, Yorkshire. Her crew were rescued. |

== 4 November ==
List of shipwrecks: 4 November 1888
| Ship | State | Description |
|---|---|---|
| Glenhead | United Kingdom | The ship was scuttled at Brodick, Isle of Arran. |
| Merion Lass | United Kingdom | The ship was driven ashore at Ardmore, Barra, Outer Hebrides. She was on a voyage from Thurso, Caithness to Belfast, County Antrim. She was refloated and beached at Tobermory, Isle of Mull. |
| Skylark | United Kingdom | The tug was gutted by fire and sank at Newcastle upon Tyne, Northumberland. |

== 5 November ==
List of shipwrecks: 5 November 1888
| Ship | State | Description |
|---|---|---|
| Abana | United Kingdom | The steamship was holed by her anchor and sank at Colombo, Ceylon. She was refloated and placed under repair. |
| Alsvid | Norway | The ship was sighted off Helsingør, Denmark whilst on a voyage from Riga, Russia to Southampton, Hampshire, United Kingdom. No further trace, reported missing. |
| Goldsmith Maid | United States | The schooner collided with the steamship Glaucus (United States) and sank in the narrows of Boston Harbor, Massachusetts. Two crewmen were lost. |
| Sirius | United Kingdom | The steamship was driven ashore at Thorpeness, Suffolk. Her crew were rescued by the Aldeburgh Lifeboat. She was on a voyage from Ghent, East Flanders, Belgium to London. |
| Unnamed | Flag unknown | The barque ran aground on the Shingle Bank, in the Solent, and sank. |

== 6 November ==
List of shipwrecks: 6 November 1888
| Ship | State | Description |
|---|---|---|
| Alladin | United Kingdom | The ship ran aground on the Inner Dowsing Sand, in the North Sea. She was on a voyage from "Pernovike" to Plymouth, Devon. She was refloated and towed in to Grimsby, Lincolnshire. |
| Alsvid | United Kingdom | The ship was sighted off Helsingør, Denmark whilst on a voyage from Riga, Russia to Southampton, Hampshire. No further trace, reported overdue. |
| Bon Accord | United Kingdom | The ship struck the pier at Sunderland, County Durham and was wrecked. Her crew were rescued; thirteen of them by rocket apparatus. She was on a voyage from Aberdeen to Sunderland. |
| Gudrun | Norway | The ship was abandoned in the North Sea off Spurn Point, Yorkshire, United Kingdom of Great Britain and Ireland. Her crew were rescued. She was on a voyage from Grimsby, Lincolnshire, United Kingdom to Dram. |
| Hammonia | Germany | The steamship ran aground in the Elbe at Schulau. She was on a voyage from New York, United States to Hamburg. She had been refloated by 8 November. |
| Ifafa | United Kingdom | The barque ran aground in the Elbe off Blankenese, Germany. She was on a voyage from Hamburg to Saint-Valery-sur-Somme, Somme, France. |
| Margaret P. Gore | United Kingdom | The schooner was driven ashore and severely damaged on the north coast of Guernsey, Channel Islands. Her crew survived. She was on a voyage from London to Jersey, Channel Islands. She was refloated on 8 November 1888 with assistance from the tug Rescue (United Kingdom) and taken in to Saint Sampson, Guernsey for repairs. |
| Maria Stella | France | The brigantine was driven ashore in the Isles of Scilly, United Kingdom. She was on a voyage from Porthcawl, Glamorgan to Fowey, Cornwall, United Kingdom. She was refloated and taken in to Old Grimsby, Isles of Scilly in a leaky condition. |
| Mongola | India | The ferry collided with the tug Clive (India) and sank in the Hooghly River near Calcutta with the loss of about 60 lives. |
| Paul | Germany | The schooner was wrecked on Inchkeith, Fife, United Kingdom. Her crew were rescued. She was on a voyage from Bremerhaven to East Wemyss, Fife. |
| Snow | United Kingdom | The schooner collided with the steamship Abergrange (United Kingdom) and sank in the Firth of Forth off Charlestown, Fife with the loss of two of her crew. Snowflake was on a voyage from Stettin, German to Seaham, County Durham. |
| Stella | United States | The steamship capsized and sank in a squall in the Monongahela River near Coal Bluff, Indiana. One passenger was killed. |
| St Joseph | United Kingdom | The Penzance ketch was driven ashore and wrecked at Penarth Head, Glamorgan. |
| Unnamed | Flag unknown | The steamship foundered in the English Channel off the coast of Cornwall with the loss of all hands. Witnessed by Galatea (United Kingdom), which was unable to render assistance. |

== 7 November ==
List of shipwrecks: 7 November 1888
| Ship | State | Description |
|---|---|---|
| Albatross | Norway | The barque collided with the steamship City of Lincoln (United Kingdom) and ran aground on the Longsand, in the North Sea off the coast of Essex, United Kingdom. Albatross was on a voyage from Sundsvall, Sweden to Cardiff, Glamorgan, United Kingdom. Her crew got aboard the Tongue Lightship ( Trinity House), from where they were rescued by the Deal Lifeboat. Albatross was refloated but then ran aground on the Sunk Sand. She was refloated with assistance from the smacks Aid, Emily, Express and Pearl (all United Kingdom) and towed in to Harwich, Essex in a derelict condition in mid-November. |
| Deutschland | Germany | The brig ran aground on the Blyth Sands, in the Thames Estuary. She was on a voyage from Danzig to the River Thames. She was refloated and towed in to Gravesend, Kent, United Kingdom. |
| Eclipse | (Russian Empire) Grand Duchy of Finland | The barque was abandoned in the Atlantic Ocean 35 nautical miles (65 km) west of the Isles of Scilly, United Kingdom and was set afire. Her crew were rescued by the steamship Santiago (United Kingdom). Eclipse was on a voyage from Ardrossan, Ayrshire, United Kingdom to Helsinki. |
| Kong Kaare | Norway | The ship sprang a leak and was abandoned in the North Sea off Lowestoft, Suffolk, United Kingdom. Her crew were rescued by the smack Our Boys (United Kingdom). Kong Kaare was on a voyage from Lagos to Hamburg, Germany. |
| Mosser | Flag unknown | The steamship ran aground at Poti, Russia. She was refloated in late November. |
| Ralph Creyke | United Kingdom | The steamship was run into by the steamship Cuxhaven (United Kingdom) at Goole, Yorkshire and was severely damaged. Ralph Creyke was on a voyage from Goole to Antwerp, Belgium. She put back to Goole. |
| Rutland | United Kingdom | The steamship ran aground on the Blyth Sands, off the coast of Northumberland. She was refloated on 15 November with assistance from the tug Undaunted and taken in to South Shields. |
| Suevia | Germany | The steamship ran aground in the Elbe at Flinkenwerder. She was refloated. |
| Union | Germany | The barque ran aground in the Humber. She was on a voyage from Nyhamn, Sweden to Hull, East Riding of Yorkshire. She was refloated and taken in to Hull in a leaky condition. |

== 8 November ==
List of shipwrecks: 8 November 1888
| Ship | State | Description |
|---|---|---|
| Charles Bal | United Kingdom | The barque was driven ashore in Dublin Bay. She was on a voyage from St. John, New Brunswick, Canada to Barrow-in-Furness, Lancashire. She was a total loss. |
| Explorer | United Kingdom | The barque was run into by the steamship Erith (United Kingdom) and sank off the Nore Lighthip ( Trinity House). Her eighteen crew were rescued by Erith. Explorer was on a voyage from London to Valparaíso, Chile. |
| Francia | Germany | The steamship ran aground in the Elbe at Schulau. |
| James Kitchen | United Kingdom | The barque was driven ashore at Lance Cove, Newfoundland Colony. |
| Livingstone | United Kingdom | The schooner was driven ashore and wrecked at Penzance, Cornwall. Her crew were rescued by the Penzance Lifeboat Dora ( Royal National Lifeboat Institution). Livingstone was on a voyage from Runcorn, Cheshire to Newcastle upon Tyne, Northumberland. |
| Nantes and Theodor Rüger | United Kingdom; Germany | The steamship Nantes collided with the full-rigged ship Theodor Rüger 36 nautical miles (67 km) east south east of The Lizard, Cornwall. Both vessels sank. Nantes was on a voyage from Liverpool, Lancashire to Havre de Grâce, Seine-Inférieure, France. Two of her 28 crew got aboard Theodor Rüger before that vessel sank with the loss of two of her own crew. Eighteen survivors took to a boat and were subsequently rescued by the steamship Antrim (United Kingdom). A crew member of Nantes was rescued by the steamship Rotterdam (Netherlands). Eight crew from Theodore Rüger and 25 from Nantes were lost. Nantes wreck located in 2024 in 75 meters (246 feet) of water in the English Channel, 30 miles south-east of Plymouth. |
| Patriot | Norway | The brig ran aground on the Longsand, in the North Sea off the coast of Essex, United Kingdom. Her seven crew got aboard the Tongue Lightship ( Trinity House), from where they were rescued by the lugger Enterprise (United Kingdom). Patriot was on a voyage from Riga, Russia to Porto, Portugal. She was refloated on 4 December and towed in to Harwich, Essex in a capsized condition by the tug Iona and three smacks (all United Kingdom). |
| Prudentia | Norway | The barque was driven ashore at Sizewell, Suffolk, United Kingdom. Her crew were rescued by the Aldeburgh Lifeboat. She was on a voyage from Fredrikstadt to Bristol, Gloucestershire, United Kingdom. |
| Shealteal | (United Kingdom of Great Britain and Ireland) Guernsey | The brigantine was driven ashore at Saint Peter Port. She was on a voyage from South Shields to Saint Peter Port. She was refloated the next day and taken in to Saint Peter Port in a leaky condition. |
| Vaitarna | United Kingdom | The steamship was sighted off Mangrol whilst on a voyage from Mandvi, Cutch State to Bombay, then disappeared. She was presumed to have foundered in the Arabian Sea in a cyclone which crossed her path during the night of 8–9 November, with the loss of all 43 crew and well over 700 passengers. |

== 9 November ==
List of shipwrecks: 9 November 1888
| Ship | State | Description |
|---|---|---|
| Bertha | Netherlands | The barque was destroyed by fire south of the Sunda Strait. Her crew were rescued by Johanna (Netherlands). Bertha was on a voyage from Rotterdam, South Holland to Batavia, Netherlands East Indies. |
| Carl Gustaff | (Russian Empire) Grand Duchy of Finland | The barque was wrecked on the Gunfleet Sand, in the North Sea off the coast of Essex, United Kingdom. Her ten crew were rescued by a lifeboat. She was on a voyage from Pori to Tarragona, Spain. |
| Margaret Johnson | United Kingdom | The schooner was driven ashore near Cahore, County Wexford with the loss of one of her three crew. Survivors were rescued by the Coastguard. |
| Nancy | United Kingdom | The smack was driven ashore and wrecked on the Mull of Kintyre, Argyllshire. She was on a voyage from Oban, Argyllshire to Greenock, Renfrewshire. |
| Père de Famille | France | The barque was driven ashore west of Dover, Kent, United Kingdom. |
| Tritton | United Kingdom | The smack was driven ashore at Mundesley, Norfolk. Her crew were rescued. |
| Unnamed | Flag unknown | The barque caught fire off the Isles of Scilly, United Kingdom and was abandoned by her crew. |

== 10 November ==
List of shipwrecks: 10 November 1888
| Ship | State | Description |
|---|---|---|
| Akaba | United Kingdom | The steamship ran aground off Great Yarmouth, Norfolk. She was on a voyage from Calcutta, India to Dundee, Forfarshire. Twenty-eight of her crew were taken off by the Gorleston Lifeboat on 10 November. Akaba was refloated on 12 November with assistance from the fishing trawlers Preceptor and Try Again (both United Kingdom), The lifeboats Mark Lane ( Royal National Lifeboat Institution) and Refuge (United Kingdom), the steamships Ouse and Richard Moxon (both United Kingdom), and the tugs Cambria, Gleaner. Meteor, United Services and Yare (all United Kingdom). She was towed in to Hull, Yorkshire. |
| Black Watch | United Kingdom | The steamship foundered in the Mediterranean Sea 200 nautical miles (370 km) west of Malta. Her crew were rescued by the steamship Ben Voirlich (United Kingdom). Black Watch was on a voyage from Nicolaieff, Russia to Hamburg, Germany |
| Magellan | Russia | The barque was wrecked on the Haisborough Sands, in the North Sea off the coast of Norfolk. Her crew were rescued by the steamship Ouse (United Kingdom). Magellan was on a voyage from Kaskinen, Sweden to Gibraltar. |
| Refuge | United Kingdom | The lifeboat collided with the steamship Akaba (United Kingdom), aground off Great Yarmouth and lost her rudder. She was taken in tow by a tug but capsized at Great Yarmouth with the loss of four of her seven crew. |
| Sarah Ann | United Kingdom | The steamship departed from Constantinople, Ottoman Empire for Naples, Italy. No further trace, reported overdue. |
| Sofia Maria | Sweden | The barque was wrecked at the mouth of the River Eden. Her seven crew survived. She was on a voyage from Gävle to Calais, France. |

== 11 November ==
List of shipwrecks: 11 November 1888
| Ship | State | Description |
|---|---|---|
| Iberia | France | "The Collision Between the 'Umbria' and 'Iberia,'" from Harper's Weekly, 24 November 1888. Iberia is at left, Umbria in the center, and Iberia's severed stern is at right. The steamship collided with the ocean liner RMS Umbria (United Kingdom) south of Long Island, New York, United States. Iberia was on a voyage from the Persian Gulf to New York City, United States. Her 30 crew abandoned ship on 11 November, and a salvage crew of three on board when she sank escaped safely in a longboat before she sank. |

== 12 November ==
List of shipwrecks: 12 November 1888
| Ship | State | Description |
|---|---|---|
| Carlton | United States | The fishing schooner departed from Gloucester, Massachusetts. No further trace, probably lost on 24 November on the Georges Bank with the loss of all twelve crew. |
| Waiting | China | The steamship was wrecked on the North-west Outlyers, off Tamsui, Formosa, with the loss of five lives. |

== 13 November ==
List of shipwrecks: 13 November 1888
| Ship | State | Description |
|---|---|---|
| Comandeur | Sweden | The brig was abandoned in the North Sea 240 nautical miles (440 km) north east of Spurn Point, Yorkshire, United Kingdom. Her crew were rescued by the smack Star of Hope (United Kingdom). Comandeur was on a voyage from Gävle to Sunderland, County Durham, United Kingdom. |
| Granite | United Kingdom | The brig ran aground on the North Gare Sands, at the mouth of the River Tees and was wrecked with the loss of all eight crew. |
| Hyppolite | United Kingdom | The schooner sprang a leak and foundered in the North Sea 13 nautical miles (24 km) east north east of the Farne Islands, Northumberland. Her crew were rescued. She was on a voyage from Middlesbrough, Yorkshire to Uddevalla, Sweden. |
| Isabella | United Kingdom | The schooner was driven ashore at "Scatraw", Kincardineshire. Her crew were rescued. |
| Joseph O. | United States | The fishing schooner departed from Gloucester, Massachusetts. No further trace, probably lost on 24 November on the Georges Bank in a gale with the loss of all twelve crew. |
| Petty | Norway | The barque foundered in the Atlantic Ocean. Her crew were rescued by Zeminder (United Kingdom). Petty was on a voyage from West Bay to Conway, Caernarfonshire, United Kingdom. |
| Princess Royal | United Kingdom | The ship departed from Liverpool, Lancashire for Douglas, Isle of Man. No further trace, reported missing. |
| St. Albans | Denmark | The brig was abandoned in the Atlantic Ocean (46°56′0″N 20°16′2″W). Her eighteen crew were rescued by the barque Garston (United Kingdom). St. Albans was on a voyage from Quebec City, Canada to London, United Kingdom. |

== 14 November ==
List of shipwrecks: 14 November 1888
| Ship | State | Description |
|---|---|---|
| Anna | Denmark | The schooner was abandoned in the North Sea 80 nautical miles (150 km) off Lindesnes, Norway. Her crew were rescued by the smack Thomas Henry (United Kingdom). Anna was on a voyage from Falkenburg, Germany to Bo'ness, Lothian, United Kingdom. |

== 15 November ==
List of shipwrecks: 15 November 1888
| Ship | State | Description |
|---|---|---|
| USFC Grampus | United States Fish Commission | The fisheries research vessel, a schooner, ran aground during a gale on Bass Rip (41°17′00″N 69°53′58″W) a shoal in the North Atlantic Ocean 2.5 nautical miles (4.6 km) east of Nantucket Island, Massachusetts and her crew abandoned ship. Unmanned, she floated free and was adrift for several days before she was recovered. She returned to service. |
| John Ward | United Kingdom | The ship departed from South Shields, County Durham for Sheerness, Kent. No further trace, reported missing. |
| Speedwell | United Kingdom | The smack was run into by the steam barge Lembroke (United Kingdom) and sank at Milford Haven, Pembrokeshire. |

== 16 November ==
List of shipwrecks: 16 November 1888
| Ship | State | Description |
|---|---|---|
| Abraham Scull | United Kingdom | The barque was driven ashore and wrecked at Kinghorn, Fife with the loss of three of her crew. |
| Argus | Flag unknown | The brig was driven ashore and wrecked at West Wemyss, Fife. Her crew were rescued. She was on a voyage from Færvik, Norway to Rotterdam, South Holland, Netherlands. |
| Herman | Germany | The schooner was driven ashore in the Bay of Weyland, Orkney Islands, United Kingdom. Her crew were rescued. She was on a voyage from Alloa, Clackmannanshire, United Kingdom to Aalborg, Denmark. |
| Hypatia | Norway | The barque was driven ashore 15 nautical miles (28 km) from Holyhead, Anglesey, United Kingdom. Her fifteen crew were rescued by the HM Coastguard using rocket apparatus and breeches buoy. |
| Industry | United Kingdom | The ship was driven ashore near Carrickfergus, County Antrim. |
| Moggie | United Kingdom | The steamship was driven ashore at Höganäs, Sweden. She was refloated in early December and taken in to Helsingør, Denmark for repairs. |
| Natal | United Kingdom | The barque departed from Calcutta, India for the Natal Colony. No further trace, presumed foundered with the loss of all on board, about 60 lives. |
| Peace | United Kingdom | The Thames barge was run into by the steamship Vane Tempest (United Kingdom) at Wapping, Middlesex and was severely damaged. |
| Pei-Ho | Germany | The barque, which was being towed from Liverpool, Lancashire to Cardiff, Glamorgan by the tug Weathercock (United Kingdom) was cast adrift off Holyhead. The captain's wife was taken off by the Holyhead Lifeboat, but her crew remained aboard. She was subsequently towed in to Holyhead Bay. |
| Serica | United Kingdom | The smack foundered in the North Sea with the loss of all five hands. |
| Velox | Norway | The barque was abandoned in Osmondwall Bay, Orkney Islands. Her crew were rescued by the steamship Express (United Kingdom). |
| Unnamed | Flag unknown | The ship was driven ashore and wrecked in Church Bay, Anglesey. Her crew survived. |
| Unnamed | Flag unknown | The schooner was observed in distress in Carnarvon Bay, presumed subsequently wrecked or foundered. |
| Unnamed | United Kingdom | The dredger was driven ashore at Greenore, County Louth. Her twenty crew survived. |

== 17 November ==
List of shipwrecks: 17 November 1888
| Ship | State | Description |
|---|---|---|
| Ettine | United Kingdom | The ship was abandoned in the North Sea. Her crew were rescued by the smack Thistle (United Kingdom). Ettine was on a voyage from Leith, Lothian to Danzig, Germany. |
| Evening Star | United Kingdom | The Mersey Flat was in collision with the steam hopper barge No. 1 (United Kingdom) and sank in the River Mersey. Evening Star was on a voyage from Birkenhead, Cheshire to Liverpool, Lancashire. |

== 18 November ==
List of shipwrecks: 18 November 1888
| Ship | State | Description |
|---|---|---|
| Fortuna | Norway | The barque was abandoned in the North Sea. Her crew were rescued by the steamship Avance (Germany). Fortuna was on a voyage from Pori, Grand Duchy of Finland to London, United Kingdom. She came ashore and was wrecked at Lemvig, Denmark. |
| Heidi | Norway | The barque was driven ashore on Little Cumbrae, Argyllshire, United Kingdom. She was on a voyage from Campbellton, New Brunswick, Canada to Glasgow, Renfrewshire, United Kingdom. She was refloated with the assistance of a tug and towed in to Glasgow in a waterlogged condition. |
| Maud M. Fish | United States | The steamship capsized and sank in the Mississippi River at Gould's Store 22 miles (35 km) downstream of New Orleans. One crewman was killed. |

== 19 November ==
List of shipwrecks: 19 November 1888
| Ship | State | Description |
|---|---|---|
| Rival | Norway | The brig was towed in to Lerwick, Shetland Islands, United Kingdom in a waterlogged condition. She was on a voyage from Arkhangelsk, Russia to Dublin, United Kingdom. |
| Two unnamed vessels | Flags unknown | The ships were crushed by ice and sank in the Sea of Azov. |

== 20 November ==
List of shipwrecks: 20 November 1888
| Ship | State | Description |
|---|---|---|
| Cross House | United Kingdom | The derelict schooner was towed in to Hull, Yorkshire by the steam trawler Pioneer (United Kingdom). |
| Isabella Leith | United Kingdom | The ship sprang a leak and sank in the North Sea off the Farne Islands, Northumberland. Her crew were rescued by the barque Eliezer (Norway). Isabella Leith was on a voyage from South Shields, County Durham to Lowestoft, Suffolk. |
| Newburgh | United Kingdom | The steamship foundered in the North Sea with the loss of sixteen of her seventeen crew. The survivor was rescued by the barque Orient (Flag unknown). Newburgh was on a voyage from Grangemouth, Stirlingshire to Aarhus, Denmark. |
| Palatine | United Kingdom | The fishing lugger capsized in a squall off Eastbourne, Sussex with the loss of both crew. |
| Progress | United Kingdom | The ship was driven ashore and wrecked near Stornoway, Isle of Lewis, Outer Hebrides. |

== 21 November ==
List of shipwrecks: 21 November 1888
| Ship | State | Description |
|---|---|---|
| Ango | France | The barque was driven ashore and wrecked at Scheveningen, South Holland, Netherlands with the loss of all but two of her crew. She was on a voyage from Grimsby, Lincolnshire, United Kingdom to Buenos Aires, Argentina. |
| Atalanta | Russia | The steamship ran aground in a storm at Ouddorp, South Holland with the loss of six lives. |
| Warblington | United Kingdom | The brig was abandoned in the North Sea 20 nautical miles (37 km) off the Galloper Sand. Her crew were rescued by the smack Glance (United Kingdom). Warblington was on a voyage from Sunderland, County Durham to Newhaven, Sussex. |

== 22 November ==
List of shipwrecks: 22 November 1888
| Ship | State | Description |
|---|---|---|
| Prudhoe Castle and Vauxhall | United Kingdom | The steamships collided in the River Tyne. Prudhoe Castle was on a voyage from London to the River Tyne. She was severely damaged and towed upstream by two tugs. Vauxhall sank near South Shields, County Durham. |
| Samana | United Kingdom | The steamship departed from New York, United States for Aux Cayes, Haiti. No further trace, reported missing. |

== 24 November ==
List of shipwrecks: 24 November 1888
| Ship | State | Description |
|---|---|---|
| Anglesey | United Kingdom | The steamship caught fire at sea. She was on a voyage from Dublin to Holyhead, Anglesey. The fire was extinguished. |
| Duncow | United Kingdom | The ship ran aground on a sandbank off Dunkirk, Nord, France. Her 23 crew were rescued. She was on a voyage from Iquique, Chile to Dunkirk. She floated off and drifted eastwards. She was boarded by fishermen and taken in to Vlissingen, Zeeland, Netherlands. |
| Inch Murren | United Kingdom | The full-rigged ship was destroyed by fire in the Atlantic Ocean (14°41′S 35°13′W). Her crew took to the lifeboats. They were rescued on 26 November by an American barque She was on a voyage from Iquique, Peru to a British port. |
| Invicta | United Kingdom | The schooner was abandoned in the North Sea 20 nautical miles (37 km) off Hartlepool, County Durham. Her crew were rescued by the barque Adamant (Germany). |
| Quarta | Germany | The steamship was sighted off Portland, Dorset, United Kingdom whilst on a voyage from Henichesk, Russia for Trondheim, Norway. No further trace, reported missing. |
| Unnamed | United Kingdom | The fishing boat foundered in the Moray Firth with the loss of all four crew. |

== 25 November ==
List of shipwrecks: 25 November 1888
| Ship | State | Description |
|---|---|---|
| Allentown | United States | The collier broke up and sank in a gale off Cape Ann, Massachusetts with the loss of all eighteen crew. |
| Bertha F. Walker | United States | The schooner sank in a gale off Nantasket Beach, Massachusetts. Crew rescued by U.S. Life Saving Service. |
| Cremona, and Toussaint l'Ouverture | Germany (Haiti) Haitian Navy | The steamship Cremona was rammed by the gunboat Toussaint l'Ouverture in an attempt to prevent her entering Port-au-Prince. Cremona was on a voyage from Hamburg to Port-au-Prince. She arrived in a sinking condition. Toussaint l'Ouverture was presumed to have foundered. |
| Edward Norton | United States | The fishing schooner was wrecked at Chatham, Massachusetts with the loss of three of her sixteen crew. |
| Estrella de Chile | United Kingdom | The barque ran aground on the Robin Rigg Sands, in the Solway Firth, and was wrecked with the loss of one of her fifteen crew. Survivors were rescued by the Maryport Lifeboat. She was on a voyage from Whitehaven, Cumberland to the River Plate. |
| Gertrude Abbott | United States | The schooner ran on rocks in a gale off Nantasket Beach, Massachusetts. Crew rescued by U.S. Life Saving Service. |
| H. C. Higginson | United States | The schooner was stranded and sank off Nantasket Beach, Massachusetts in a gale after her anchor chains parted with the loss of her Captain and 2 crewmen. Surviving crew rescued by U.S. Life Saving Service. Later raised and taken into port. |
| Mary Davies | United Kingdom | The schooner was abandoned off Osmington, Dorset. Her crew were rescued by the Weymouth Lifeboat and a tug. She was subsequently towed in to Weymouth, Dorset by the tug Queen (United Kingdom). |
| Rival | Norway | The schooner was driven ashore on Bressay, Shetland Islands, United Kingdom. |
| Snaefell | United Kingdom | The schooner was driven ashore on Bressay. |

== 26 November ==
List of shipwrecks: 26 November 1888
| Ship | State | Description |
|---|---|---|
| Domingo | United Kingdom | The steamship was abandoned in the Atlantic Ocean. Her crew were rescued by the steamship Napier (United Kingdom). Domingo was on a voyage from Santiago, Chile to Philadelphia, Pennsylvania, United States. |
| Ethel M. Davis | Flag unknown | The schooner capsized in the Atlantic Ocean (35°04′N 70°52′W). Her four crew were rescued on 30 November. |
| Helena | United Kingdom | The steamship was driven ashore at Europa Point, Gibraltar. Her crew were rescued. Helena was on a voyage from Marianople, Russia to Portishead, Somerset. She subsequently broke her back and was condemned as a total loss. |
| Luneburg | United Kingdom | The steamship ran aground off Poel, Germany. She was on a voyage from West Hartlepool, County Durham to Wismar, Germany. |
| Oliver Dyer | United States | The schooner was wrecked on rocks at the entrance to the harbor of Portsmouth, New Hampshire during a gale/snowstorm, with the loss of one crewman. |

== 27 November ==
List of shipwrecks: 27 November 1888
| Ship | State | Description |
|---|---|---|
| Douglas | United Kingdom | The ship was abandoned in the North Sea off Heligoland with the loss of two of the 27 people on board. Survivors were rescued by the steam trawler Petrel (United Kingdom). Douglas was on a voyage from the Gulf of California to Hamburg, Germany. |
| George Peabody | United Kingdom | The yawl was run into by the smack Uncle Tom (United Kingdom) and sank 1 nautical mile (1.9 km) off Scarborough, Yorkshire. |
| Hermann | Germany | The full-rigged ship was lost off Malden Island. Her crew were rescued by HMS Hyacinth (Royal Navy). |
| Regina | United Kingdom | The ship ran aground on Hammond's Knowl, in the North Sea off the coast of Norfolk, and sank. Her 25 crew took to two boats; thirteen in one boat were rescued by a lugger John Macey (United Kingdom), the others were reported missing. |
| Sheila | United States | The barque was abandoned at sea. Her eighteen crew were rescued by RMS Para (United Kingdom). Sheila was on a voyage from Rio de Janeiro, Brazil to Norfolk, Virginia. |
| T. A. Lambert | United States | The schooner foundered in the Atlantic Ocean. Her crew were rescued by the steamship Gleadowe (United Kingdom). |
| Two Sisters | United Kingdom | The fishing smack was run down and sunk in the River Thames at Woolwich, Kent by a steamship with the loss of two of her five crew. Survivors were rescued by the steamship. |
| Undine | United Kingdom | The fishing smack ran aground and sank at Lowestoft, Suffolk. Her crew were rescued by rocket apparatus. |
| Virgo | Sweden | The barque foundered off Malden Island with the loss of five of her crew. Survivors were rescued by HMS Hyacinth (Royal Navy). |
| Unnamed | Flag unknown | The full-rigged ship foundered in the Atlantic Ocean 100 nautical miles (190 km) east of Cape Delaware, United States with the loss of all hands. Witnessed by the steamship Panama (France), which was unable to render assistance. |

== 28 November ==
List of shipwrecks: 28 November 1888
| Ship | State | Description |
|---|---|---|
| Istrian | United Kingdom | The steamship ran aground in the River Mersey. She was on a voyage from Liverpool, Lancashire to Boston, Massachusetts, United States. She was refloated the next day. |
| Shadwan | United Kingdom | The steamship foundered in the North Sea off Berwick upon Tweed, Northumberland. Her crew were rescued by the tug Sir George Elliot (United Kingdom). She was on a voyage from Fiume, Austria-Hungary to Leith, Lothian. |
| Staithes Lifeboat | Royal National Lifeboat Institution | The lifeboat capsized with the loss of one of her thirteen crew. She was subsequently towed in to Middlesbrough, Yorkshire by a steamship. |
| William and Sarah | United Kingdom | The barquentine foundered off the Isle of Man. Her crew were rescued. She was on a voyage from Barrow-in-Furness, Lancashire to Ayr. |

== 30 November ==
List of shipwrecks: 30 November 1888
| Ship | State | Description |
|---|---|---|
| Fred Thomson | United Kingdom | The ship departed from Great Yarmouth, Norfolk for Cork. No further trace, reported missing. |

== Unknown date ==
List of shipwrecks: Unknown date in November 1888
| Ship | State | Description |
|---|---|---|
| Alabama | Norway | The barque was driven ashore at Great Yarmouth, Norfolk, United Kingdom. She was on a voyage from Helsinki, Grand Duchy of Finland to Ghent, East Flanders, Belgium. |
| Albertus | Germany | The steamship ran aground in the Seine. She was refloated and put back to Havre de Grâce, Seine-Inférieure, France. |
| Alexandra | Denmark | The barque was driven ashore and wrecked at Egersund, Norway. |
| Alice Jane | (United Kingdom of Great Britain and Ireland) Guernsey | The schooner ran aground on the Gunfleet Sand, in the North Sea off the coast of Essex. Her crew were rescued by the pilot cutter No. 7 (United Kingdom). Alice Jane was on a voyage from Sundsvall, Sweden to Jersey, Channel Islands. She floated off and was towed in to Harwich, Essex by a tug. |
| Amalfi | Germany | The steamship ran aground in the Elbe at Schulau. She was on a voyage from Hamburg to New York, United States. |
| Amicizia | Italy | The barque caught fire at Buenos Aires, Argentina and was scuttled. |
| Anna | Netherlands | The ship was driven ashore at Maasvlakte, South Holland. She was on a voyage from "Progresso" to Rotterdam, South Holland. |
| Annie Marie | Denmark | The brig was wrecked at Santa Catarina. Her crew were rescued. |
| Annie Maude | United Kingdom | The schooner was driven ashore on Sylt, Germany. Her crew were rescued, She was on a voyage from Bangor to Hamburg. |
| Apollo | Germany | The barque was driven ashore in the Nieuwe Diep. She was on a voyage from Gävle, Sweden to Sydney. She was refloated but found to be a constructive total loss. |
| Arendal | Norway | The barque ran aground at Saltholm, Denmark. She was on a voyage from Vyborg, Grand Duchy of Finland to Bordeaux, Gironde, France. |
| Argo | Norway | The barque ran aground in the River Carron and capsized. She was then run into by the barque Camilla (Germany). Argo was on a voyage from Kronstadt, Russia to Grangemouth, Stirlingshire, United Kingdom. She was a total loss. |
| Armide | Sweden | The schooner was driven ashore and wrecked at Great Yarmouth. Her crew were rescued by rocket apparatus. She was on a voyage from Gothenburg to Great Yarmouth. |
| Ashmore | United Kingdom | The ship ran aground on the Marion Reef. She was on a voyage from London to Adelaide, South Australia. She was refloated and completed her voyage. |
| Astrea | Netherlands | The steamship was driven ashore near Pillau, Germany. Her crew were rescued. |
| Bernardus | Netherlands | The schooner was towed in to Terschelling, Friesland in a sinking condition. |
| Betty | Russia | The ship was damaged by ices and became waterlogged at Kronstadt. |
| Bhundara | India | The ship was damaged in a cyclone at Madras. |
| Bohemia | Germany | The steamship ran aground in the Elbe at Schulau. She was on a voyage from Hamburg to New York. |
| Boyn | United Kingdom | The schooner was driven ashore at Hela, Germany. She was on a voyage from Danzig, Germany to Leith, Lothian. |
| Bride | United Kingdom | The steamship was driven ashore at Stugsund, Sweden. |
| British Duke | United Kingdom | The ship was driven ashore and wrecked west of Cape St. Francis, Cape Colony. Her crew were rescued by Anglican (United Kingdom). |
| Bromo | Netherlands | The steamship struck a rock in Netherlands East Indies waters and sprang a leak . |
| Burgermeiste Stuve | Germany | The derelict brig was driven ashore and wrecked at Gothenburg. |
| Camille | Denmark | The schooner was driven ashore at Thisted. |
| Castle Eden | United Kingdom | The ship struck a rock in the Red Sea and was damaged. She put in to Aden, Aden Governorate. |
| Catharina | Germany | The galiot was driven ashore and wrecked on Sylt. She was on a voyage from Riga, Russia to Bremen. |
| Catherine | United Kingdom | The ship was driven ashore at Lindisfarne, Northumberland. She was on a voyage from Stettin, Germany to Sunderland, County Durham. |
| Cecelia | Denmark | The brig was abandoned at sea. Her crew were rescued by the steamship Sweden (United Kingdom). Cecelaia was on a voyage from Sundsvall to Grimsby, Lincolnshire, United Kingdom. |
| Ceylon | United Kingdom | The ship was wrecked at Thisted. |
| Charlotta | Norway | The schooner was driven ashore and severely damaged at Visby, Gotland, Sweden. She was on a voyage from Gävle to Shoreham-by-Sea, Sussex, United Kingdom. |
| Christina Elizabeth | Norway | The barque was driven ashore at Key West, Florida, United States. She was on a voyage from Jamaica to Havre de Grâce. |
| Ciampa Emilia | Italy | The ship collided with a dredger and was severely damaged. She put in to Philadelphia, Pennsylvania, United States. |
| Comet | United Kingdom | The ketch was driven ashore and severely damaged at the Hurst Castle, Hampshire. |
| Corisande | United Kingdom | The smack was driven ashore at Withernsea, Yorkshire. Her crew were rescued by rocket apparatus. |
| Corrientes | Germany | The steamship ran aground in the Elbe at Finkenwerder. She was on a voyage from Hamburg to the River Plate. |
| Cromwell | Norway | The barque ran aground on the Shipwash Sand, in the North Sea off the coast of Suffolk, United Kingdom. She was on a voyage from Helsinki to Barcelona, Spain. She was refloated, but then ran aground on the Cork Sand. Her crew were rescued. She was refloated a week later and towed in to Harwich, Essex. |
| Cydonia | United Kingdom | The steamship ran aground in the Elbe at Schulau, Germany. She was on a voyage from Hamburg to Boston. She had been refloated by 8 November. |
| Dart | (United Kingdom of Great Britain and Ireland) Isle of Man | The schooner was abandoned in the Irish Sea. She was on a voyage from Douglas to Liverpool, Lancashire. She came ashore at Douglas Head and was wrecked. |
| De Bay | United Kingdom | The steamship was driven ashore at Grado, Italy. She was on a voyage from Methil, Fife to Venice, Italy. |
| Direktor Barrow | Germany | The schooner collided with the steamship Ingraban (Germany) and sank at Niuzhuang, China. |
| Dunahof | Russia | The ship was damaged by ice and became waterlogged at Kronstadt. |
| Eddystone | United Kingdom | The ship was driven ashore and wrecked 2 nautical miles (3.7 km) south of Withernsea, Yorkshire. Her crew were rescued. |
| Elphinstone | United Kingdom | The steamship caught fire at Charleston, South Carolina, United States. |
| Emma | Flag unknown | The ship was driven ashore at Vestervig, Denmark. She was on a voyage from Pori, Grand Duchy of Finland to Dunkirk, Nord, France. |
| Edward Percy | United Kingdom | The barque ran aground in the Elbe at Schulau. She was the run into by the steamship Elbe (Germany) and was damaged. Edward Percy was on a voyage from Hamburg to San Francisco, California, United States |
| Erwin Rickmers | Germany | The barque ran aground at Penarth, Glamorgan, United Kingdom. She was on a voyage from Penarth to Singapore, Straits Settlements. |
| Esk Holme | United Kingdom | The steamship was driven ashore on Rottum, Friesland, Netherlands. She was on a voyage from an English port to Hamburg. |
| Express | United Kingdom | The barque was driven ashore on Scarba, Argyllshire. Her crew were rescued. |
| Fitzmaurice | United Kingdom | The steamship foundered in the North Sea. Her crew survived. |
| Flora Ross | United Kingdom | The schooner was driven ashore. She was on a voyage from Dunkirk to Hamburg. She was refloated and towed in to Great Yarmouth in a leaky condition. |
| Fram | Norway | The steamship was driven ashore at "Swinboderne". She was on a voyage from Rouen, Seine-Inférieure to Stettin. She was refloated and taken in to Helsingør, Denmark waterlogged at the bow. |
| Frank | Sweden | The ship was wrecked at sea with the loss of nine of her ten crew. The survivor was rescued by the schooner Dagny (Norway). |
| G. and W. Jones | United Kingdom | The ship was wrecked at Marstrand, Norway. She was on a voyage from Cuxhaven, Germany to Landskrona, Sweden. |
| Gate City | United States | The steamship was driven ashore in the Savannah River. |
| Gayton | United Kingdom | The barque was driven ashore in the Nieuwe Diep. She subsequently became a wreck. |
| Gibraltar | Norway | The full-rigged ship was abandoned in the Atlantic Ocean. Her crew were rescued by Magnhild (Flag unknown). |
| Glen Dochart | United Kingdom | The steamship ran aground in the Danube 16 nautical miles (30 km) from its mouth. |
| Grace Gibson | United Kingdom | The barque was driven ashore at Noddle Point, Ayrshire. She was on a voyage from Glasgow, Renfrewshire to Valparaíso, Chile. |
| Hannah | Norway | The barque was driven ashore and wrecked at Philadelphia. She was on a voyage from Philadelphia to Limerick, United Kingdom. |
| Harrogate | United Kingdom | The steamship ran aground in the Elbe at Schulau. She was refloated and taken in to Altona, Germany. |
| Hebridean | United Kingdom | The steamship struck a sunken rock in the Sound of Mull. She put in to Oban, Argyllshire waterlogged at the bow. |
| Helena Anna | United Kingdom | The ship was damaged by ice and was beached at Luleå, Sweden. |
| Horatio | Flag unknown | The steamship was wrecked off the Dutch coast. Her crew survived. |
| Isabella Hall | United Kingdom | The ship ran aground on the Tongue Sand, in the Thames Estuary. Her crew were rescued by the steamship Albatross (United Kingdom). Isabella Hall was on a voyage from London to Cardiff, Glamorgan. |
| Jane | United Kingdom | The ship was driven ashore at "Killisport". She was on a voyage from Belfast, County Antrim to Londonderry. |
| Job | Russia | The barque ran aground at "Killarp". She was on a voyage from Gothenburg to Kotka, Grand Duchy of Finland. She was refloated and towed in to Helsingør. |
| Johann Wilhelm | Germany | The barque ran aground on the Middle Sand, in the Thames Estuary. She was refloated on 6 November and towed in to Gravesend, Kent by the tug Conqueror (United Kingdom). |
| Joseph Somes | United Kingdom | The steamship ran aground in the Gulf of Bothnia. She was on a voyage from Raumo, Grand Duchy of Finland to Hull. She was refloated and resumed her voyage, but put into Copenhagen in a leaky condition. |
| Jumbo | United Kingdom | The brigantine was driven ashore and wrecked at "Banco Chico", Argentina. She was on a voyage from Whitehaven, Cumberland to Rosario, Argentina. |
| Kong Carl | Norway | The barque ran aground off "Dracko", Denmark. She was on a voyage from Rostock, Germany to Tvedestrand. |
| Lady Celia Hay | United Kingdom | The schooner was driven ashore at Boulmer, Northumberland. She was on a voyage from Dysart, Fife to Teignmouth, Devon. |
| Langstone | United Kingdom | The full-rigged ship was severely damaged by fire at Napier, New Zealand. |
| La Plata | Norway | The barque was wrecked in Macrae Bay, Islay, Inner Hebrides, United Kingdom. |
| La Vendée | France | The steamship struck the Cabezos Rock, off the coast of Spain and was wrecked. She sank on 27 November. |
| Lizzie Waters | United Kingdom | The brig was abandoned in the North Sea before 18 November. Her crew were rescued by the barque Phison (Austria-Hungary). Lizzie Waters subsequently came ashore at "Hirtlingso", Norway. |
| Lucie | Russia | The ship was damaged by ice and became waterlogged at Kronstadt. |
| Ludvig | Flag unknown | The barque sprang a leak and was abandoned at sea. Her crew were rescued. She was on a voyage from Sundsvall to Honfleur, Manche, France. She subsequently came ashore at Thisted and was wrecked. |
| Lydia | Sweden | The barque was driven ashore and wrecked at Withernsea. Her crew were rescued. She was on a voyage from Hull, Yorkshire to Hartlepool, County Durham, United Kingdom. |
| Lymington | United Kingdom | The steamship was driven ashore at Hornsea, Yorkshire. Her crew were rescued. She was on a voyage from London to Sunderland, County Durham. |
| Maggie M. | Canada | The barque went ashore on Cape Negro Island, Nova Scotia. She was on a voyage from Sydney, Nova Scotia to Saint John, New Brunswick and became a total loss; the crew got ashore. |
| Mandalay | United Kingdom | The steamship ran aground in the Elbe at Finkenwerder. She was on a voyage from Taganrog, Russia to Hamburg. |
| Margaretha | Germany | The schooner was driven ashore and wrecked on Sylt. She was on a voyage from Kristiansand, Norway to Mariensiel. |
| Maria | United Kingdom | The steamship sank off Charlestown, Cornwall. |
| Marie Melanie | United Kingdom | The schooner ran aground and was wrecked at Broadstairs, Kent. She was on a voyagte from South Shields, County Durham to Broadstairs. |
| Marsala | Germany | The steamship ran aground in the Elbe at Finkenwerder. She was on a voyage from Hamburg to New York. |
| Mary Elizabeth | United Kingdom | The barque was driven into Dunphaile Castle (United Kingdom) at Santiago de Cuba, Cuba and was severely damaged. |
| Mauritz | Sweden | The brig was driven ashore at Egmond aan Zee, North Holland, Netherlands. Her crew were rescued. She waws on a voyage from Kronstadt to Great Yarmouth. |
| Merida | United Kingdom | The steamship was driven ashore at "Yalabara", Ceylon. She was later refloated and towed in to Colombo, Ceylon. |
| Messina | Italy | The steamship ran aground on the Meloria Bank, in the Mediterranean Sea off Livorno. |
| Minnet | Sweden | The barque ran aground off the Maplin Lighthouse, in the Thames Estuary and was wrecked. Her crew were rescued by the Clacton Lifeboat. She was on a voyage from Sandarne to London. |
| Mizpah | United Kingdom | The smack was driven ashore at Great Yarmouth. |
| Moro Castle | United States | The barque was driven into the breakwater and wrecked at Philadelphia. She was on a voyage from Philadelphia to San Francisco. |
| Möwe | Germany | The steamship was driven ashore on Vlieland, Friesland, Netherlands. Her crew were rescued. She was on a voyage from Hamburg to Santos, Brazil. |
| Nanette | Norway | The schooner foundered near Marstrand. She was on a voyage from Hartlepool to a Danish port. |
| Nell | United Kingdom | The smack was lost in the Dogger Bank with the loss of two of her crew. |
| Neptun | Norway | The barque was driven ashore and wrecked at Monster, South Holland. |
| Noemie | France | The barque was wrecked off the Punta José Ignacio Lighthouse, Uruguay. |
| Oevelgonne | Germany | The steamship ran aground in the Elbe at Lühe. She was on a voyage from New York to Hamburg. |
| Olaf Kyrre | Norway | The ship was abandoned in the North Sea 12 nautical miles (22 km) off Flamborough Head, Yorkshire. Her crew were rescued by the tug Champion (United Kingdom). Olaf Kyrre was on a voyage from Sundsvall to Calais, France. She subsequently came ashore at Bridlington, Yorkshire and was wrecked. |
| Olaus | Norway | The ship was damaged by ice at Sundsvall and became waterlogged. |
| Peace | United Kingdom | The smack was driven ashore and wrecked at Boulmer, Northumberland with the loss of two of her three crew. The survivor was rescued by rocket apparatus. |
| Pomona | Germany | The barque was wrecked on the Oosterbank, in the North Sea. Her crew were rescued. |
| Reaper | (United Kingdom of Great Britain and Ireland) Isle of Man | The ship was driven ashore at Kylerhea, Isle of Skye, Outer Hebrides. |
| Regolo R. | Italy | The barque was wrecked on the coast of Sardinia. All on board were rescued. She was on a voyage from Terranova to a Spanish port. |
| Richard | United Kingdom | The smack was driven ashore and wrecked at Withernsea. Her crew were rescued. |
| Samuel and Elizabeth | United Kingdom | The fishing boat was driven ashore at Lowestoft, Suffolk. Her crew were rescued by rocket apparatus. |
| Sandringham | United Kingdom | The steamship caught fire at Charleston, South Carolina. |
| Sir George Elliot | United Kingdom | The tug struck the quayside at South Shields and sank. |
| Slesvig | Denmark | The schooner was taken in to Ostend, West Flanders, Belgium in a derelict condition. |
| Stanmore | United Kingdom | The steamship was driven ashore at "Definofka", Russia. She was on a voyage from Newcastle upon Tyne, Northumberland to Odesa, Russia. |
| Starucca | United States | The steamship at Buffalo, New York. |
| Stockholm City | United Kingdom | The steamship ran aground in the Elbe at Schulau. She was on a voyage from Hamburg to Boston. |
| St. Pierre | France | The brig collided with the steamship Wilfred (United Kingdom) 54 nautical miles (100 km) off Cádiz, Spain and was severely damaged. St. Pierre was on a voyage from Miramichi, New Brunswick, Canada to Algiers, Algeria. She was towed in to Cádiz in a severely leaky condition by Wilfred. |
| Swift | United Kingdom | The brig was driven ashore at Spurn Head, Yorkshire. Her crew were rescued by the Spurn Lifeboat. She was on a voyage from South Shields to Shoreham-by-Sea. |
| Tamar E. Marshall | Flag unknown | The ship was driven ashore in the Palawan Islands. She was refloated and beached on Balabac Island, Spanish East Indies. |
| Teviot | United Kingdom | The steamship ran aground at Leith. She was on a voyage from Fiume, Austria-Hungary to Leith. |
| Thomas Boustead | United Kingdom | The schooner was driven ashore near the mouth of the River Weaver. |
| T. J. Robson | United Kingdom | The steamship ran aground in the Elbe at Finkenwerder. She was on a voyage from Varna, Bulgaria to Hamburg. |
| Times | United Kingdom | The steamship ran aground in the River Thames at Towers Stairs, London. She was on a voyage from Calais to London. |
| Tomasso | Italy | The barque was beached at Belmullet, County Mayo, United Kingdom. She was on a voyage from Newport, Monmouthshire, United Kingdom to Cape Town, Cape Colony. She subsequently became a wreck. |
| Towy | United Kingdom | The barque collided with the barque Emma Sims (United Kingdom) at Buenos Aires and was severely damaged. |
| True Love | United Kingdom | The smack was driven ashore near Withernsea. Her crew were rescued. |
| Twee Zusters | Netherlands | The barque was abandoned in the North Sea. Her crew were rescued. She was on a voyage from Hudiksvall, Sweden to Delfzijl, Groningen. |
| Two Sisters | United Kingdom | The ship was run down by a steamship and sank in the River Thames at Woolwich, Kent with the loss of two of her five crew. |
| Urania | Flag unknown | The ship was driven ashore at Lemvig, Denmark. Her crew were rescued. She was on a voyage from Memel to Varel, Germany. |
| Valkyrien | Norway | The ship was abandoned in the North Sea 170 nautical miles (310 km) north east of Aberdeen, United Kingdom. Her crew were rescued by the schooner Active (United Kingdom). |
| Vesta | United Kingdom | The steamship struck the wreck of Triumph (United Kingdom) in the River Tyne and was beached. |
| Vestalinden | Norway | The brig became waterlogged on the Risobank. She was on a voyage from Sundsvall to Calais. |
| Walter and Mary | United Kingdom | The smack was driven ashore at Great Yarmouth. |
| Wonder | United Kingdom | The smack sank at Southampton, Hampshire. |
| Zephyr | France | The fishing smack collided with the steamship Elemore (United Kingdom) and sank in the English Channel. |
| Unnamed | Flag unknown | The ship sank 2 1/2 nautical miles (4.6 km) off Spurn Head. |
| Five unnamed vessels | Flags unknown | The ships were crushed by ice and sank in the Sea of Azov between 12 and 18 November. Their 63 crew members survived. |
