= José Fernández =

José Fernández may refer to:

== Arts, academia and entertainment ==
- José Antonio Fernández de Castro (1887–1951), Cuban journalist and writer
- José Joaquín Fernández de Lizardi (1776–1827), Mexican writer and political journalist
- José Fernández Montesinos (1897–1972), Spanish historian and literary critic
- José Fernández Santillán (born 1953), Mexican academic
- José Ramón Fernández (journalist) (born 1946), Mexican journalist
- Joseíto Fernández (1908–1979), Cuban singer

== Business ==
- José Antonio Fernández Carbajal (born 1954), Mexican businessman
- José Ramon Fernández (businessman) (1808–1883), sugar baron in Puerto Rico

== Politics and government ==
- Guadalupe Victoria (born José Miguel Ramón Adaucto Fernández, 1786–1843), first president of Mexico
- José Fernández Salvador (1775–1853), Ecuadorian politician and jurist
- José Fernández Madrid (1789–1830), Colombian statesman, physician, scientist, and writer
- José Luciano Fernández (active 1835–1836), acting governor of San Juan, Argentina
- Jose B. Fernandez Jr. (1923–1994), Filipino governor and banker
- José Ramón Fernández (1923–2019), vice-president of the Cuban Council of Ministers
- José Félix Fernández Estigarribia (born 1941), Paraguayan foreign minister, ambassador, and senator
- Jose W. Fernandez (born 1955), U.S. assistant secretary of state for economic, energy, and business affairs
- Jose Fernandez Dubrock (21st century), Chilean forest engineer and politician

== Religion ==
- José Fernández Montaña (1842–1935), Spanish priest, jurist, linguist and historian
- José Fernández Arteaga (1933–2021), Mexican prelate of the Roman Catholic Church

== Sport ==
- José Fernandez (athlete) (born 1975), Paralympic athlete from Spain
- Jose Fernandez (basketball) (born 1971), head coach of the Dallas Wings
- José Fernandez (equestrian) (born 1947), Brazilian Olympic equestrian
- José Fernández (middle-distance runner) (born 1933), Spanish Olympic athlete
- José Fernández Migoya (1900–1968), Cuban chess player
- José Fernández (racing driver) (born 1968), Australian racing driver
- José Salgado Fernández (born 1989), Mexican boxer

=== Baseball ===
- José Fernández (right-handed pitcher) (1992–2016), Cuban-American baseball pitcher
- José Fernández (left-handed pitcher) (born 1993), Dominican baseball pitcher
- José Fernández (third baseman) (born 1974), Dominican Republic professional baseball player in the United States, Korea, and Japan
- José Fernández (infielder) (born 2003), Venezuelan baseball infielder
- José María Fernández (1896–1972), Cuban-born baseball catcher and team manager, Negro leagues career 1916–1950
- José Miguel Fernández (born 1988), Cuban-born baseball second baseman

=== Footballers ===
- José Fernández (Chilean footballer) (1928–2009), Chilean footballer
- José Alberto Fernández (born 1970), Honduran footballer
- José Carlos Fernández (born 1983), Peruvian footballer
- José Carlos Fernández González (born 1971), Bolivian footballer
- José Iglesias Fernández (1926–2007), Spanish footballer
- José Ignacio Fernández (disambiguation)
- José Luis Fernández (born 1987), Argentine footballer
- José Fernández Santini (born 1939), member of Peru's 1970 FIFA World Cup squad
