= HMS Caroline (1882) =

Sloop of the Royal Navy

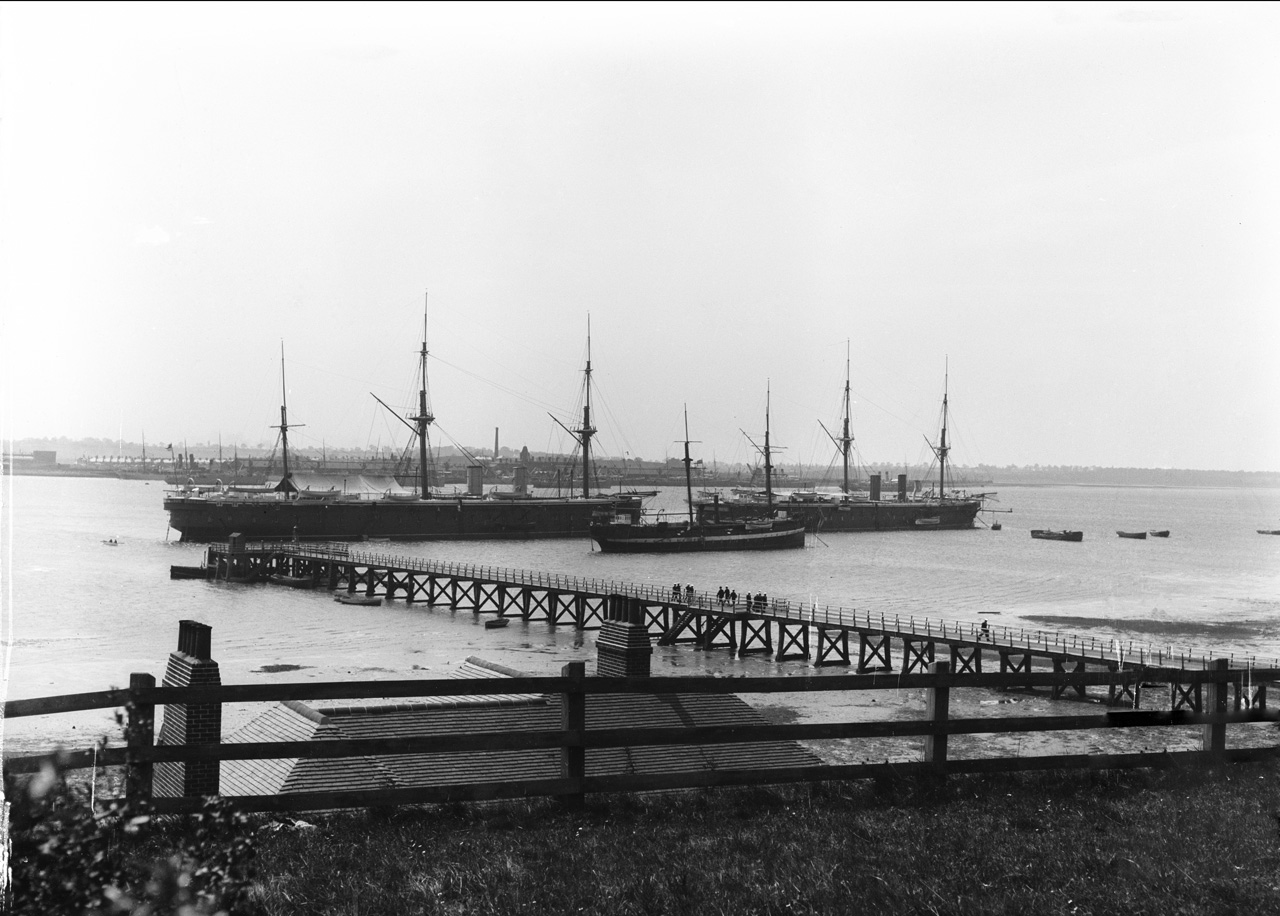
- HMS Caroline (centre foreground) at Shotley in 1906. Behind her (left) is HMS Minotaur and (right) HMS Agincourt.

History

United Kingdom
- Name: HMS Caroline
- Builder: Sheerness Dockyard
- Laid down: 24 October 1881
- Launched: 25 November 1882
- Commissioned: 27 January 1886
- Fate: Hulk 1897; Renamed Ganges 1908; Renamed Powerful III 1913; Renamed Impregnable IV 1919; Sold 31 August 1929

General characteristics
- Class & type: Satellite-class sloop
- Displacement: 1,420 tons
- Length: 200 ft (61 m) pp
- Beam: 38 ft (12 m)
- Draught: 15 ft 9 in (4.80 m)
- Installed power: 1,400 ihp (1,044 kW)
- Propulsion: Single horizontal compound-expansion steam engine; Single screw
- Sail plan: Barque-rigged
- Range: Approximately 6,000 nmi (11,000 km) at 10 kn (19 km/h)
- Complement: 170-200
- Armament: Two BL 6-inch/100-pounder (81cwt) Mk II guns; Ten BL 5-inch (127.0 mm) 50-pounder (38cwt) guns; One light gun; Four machine guns
- Armour: Internal steel deck over machinery and magazines

HMS Caroline was a Satellite-class composite screw sloop of the Royal Navy, built at Sheerness Dockyard, fitted with Maudslay, Sons and Field machinery and launched on 25 November 1882. She was later reclassified as a corvette.

== Service history ==
With her sister ships Heroine and Hyacinth, Caroline was sent to the China Station and recommissioned at Hong Kong on 18 February 1890. On 7 January 1896 Caroline left Hong Kong in company with Grafton and Mercury for a return to Portsmouth via Singapore, Aden, Suez, Malta, Gibraltar and Plymouth. On arrival she was reduced to dockyard reserve.

Caroline was hulked in 1897 and served at Harwich as the hospital ship to the boys' training ship HMS Ganges at Harwich. Once shore hospital facilities had been built in 1902, Caroline was refitted as overflow accommodation for 60 boys. In 1904 both hulks left Harwich for Shotley, Suffolk, and as the school expanded ashore, a series of old ships inherited the name Ganges, with Caroline receiving the name in April 1908. In 1913 she was renamed Powerful III and moved to Devonport, where she became part of the training establishment at Devonport. In November 1919 she inherited the name of the training establishment as Impregnable IV. She was sold on 31 August 1929.

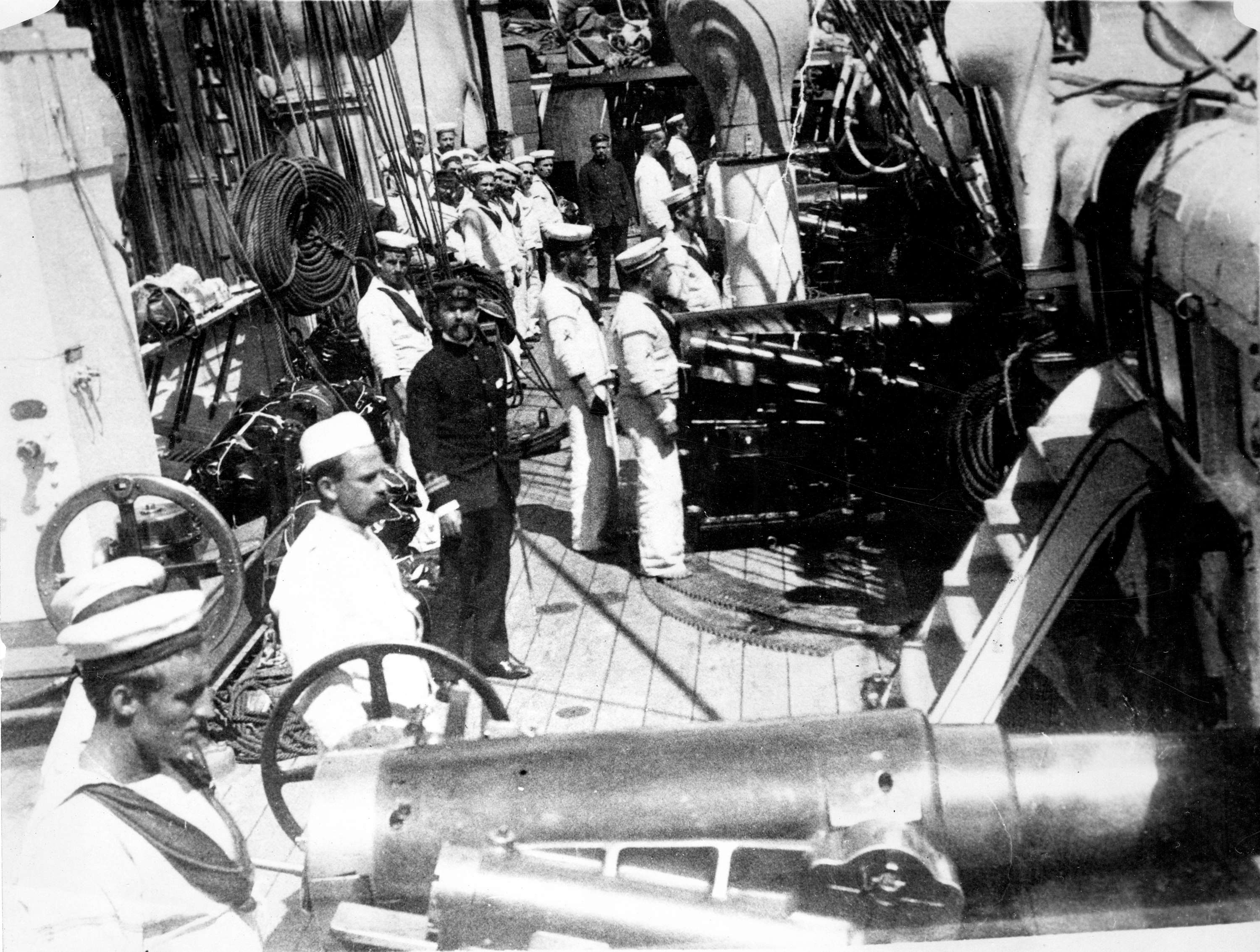
Gunnery practice with 5-inch breech-loading guns in 1890

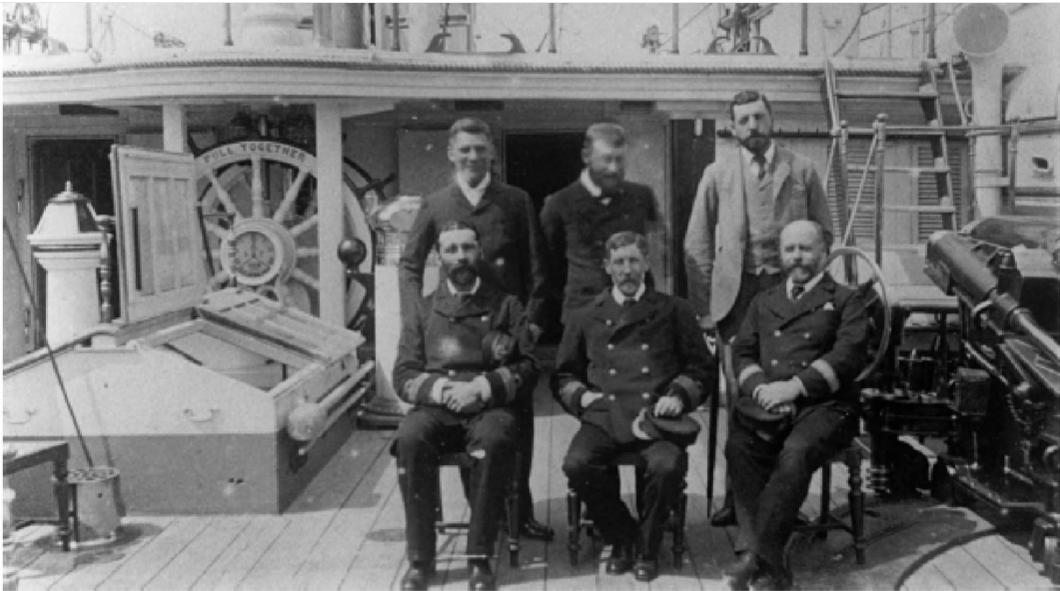
The officers of Caroline in 1893
