= José Ignacio Fernández =

José Ignacio Fernández may refer to:

- José Ignacio Fernández Garcia (born 1973), Spanish football manager
- José Ignacio Fernández Iglesias (born 1990), Spanish international footballer
- José Ignacio Fernández Palacios (born 1967), Spanish former footballer

== See also ==
- José Fernández (disambiguation)
- José Ignacio (disambiguation)
- Nacho (disambiguation), nickname used for these subjects
