= List of shipwrecks in April 1873 =

The list of shipwrecks in April 1873 includes ships sunk, foundered, grounded, or otherwise lost during April 1873.

== 1 April ==
List of shipwrecks: 1 April 1873
Ship	State	Description
Atlantic	United Kingdom	The wreck of Atlantic. The ocean liner hit an underwater rock off Marr's Head, Meagher's Island (now Mars Head, Mars Island), Nova Scotia, Canada, and sank with the loss of between 535 and 560 lives. There were 371 survivors. She was on a voyage from Liverpool, Lancashire to New York, United States.
Queen of the Belgians	United Kingdom	The steamship was driven ashore at Littlestone, Kent. She was on a voyage from Folkestone, Kent to Boulogne, Pas-de-Calais, France. She was refloated on 10 April and taken in to Folkestone.

== 2 April ==
List of shipwrecks: 2 April 1873
Ship	State	Description
Abbie Perkins	United States	The schooner exploded off Start Point, Devon and was destroyed by fire. Her five crew were rescued by the schooner Challenger (United Kingdom). Abbie Perkins was on a voyage from New York to London, United Kingdom.
Cecile	United States	The ship was driven ashore and wrecked on Cuttyhunk Island, Massachusetts. She was on a voyage from Demerara, British Guiana to Boston, Massachusetts.
Corinda Adema	France	The ship foundered off Saint-Armel, Morbihan. She was on a voyage from "Borneuf" to Saint-Armel.
Holmside, and Raithwaite Hall	United Kingdom	The steamships collided in the River Tyne and were both severely damaged. Holmside was on a voyage from South Shields, County Durham to London. She put back to South Shields. Raithwaite Hall was on a voyage from Antwerp, Belgium to South Shields. She was taken in to North Shields, Northumberland for repairs.

== 3 April ==
List of shipwrecks: 3 April 1873
Ship	State	Description
Amelie	Italy	The brig collided with the collier Mary Austin (United Kingdom) and foundered in the Irish Sea off Holyhead, Anglesey. Her crew were rescued by Mary Austin. Amelie was on a voyage from New Orleans, Louisiana, United States to Liverpool, Lancashire.
Fremond	France	The ship was in collision with the steamship Gogo (France at Bordeaux, Gironde and was severely damaged.
Janet Shennan	United Kingdom	The schooner ran aground off the coast of Essex. She was on a voyage from Ipswich, Suffolk to London. She was refloated.
United Friends	United Kingdom	The sloop ran aground on the East Hoyle Bank, in Liverpool Bay. She was on a voyage from Port Dinorwic, Caernarfonshire to Runcorn, Cheshire.

== 4 April ==
List of shipwrecks: 4 April 1873
Ship	State	Description
Annie Mills	United Kingdom	The schooner ran aground on the North Tail Ridge, in the Bristol Channel off the coast of Devon and was wrecked. Her crew were rescued by the Appledore Lifeboat. She was on a voyage from Liverpool, Lancashire to Appledore, Devon.
Bismarck	Italy	The ship struck a floating wreck and sprang a leak. She sank off Sal, Cape Verde Islands on 7 April. Her crew were rescued by the steamship Po (Flag unknown). Bismack was on a voyage from London, United Kingdom to Algoa Bay.
Cedar	Germany	The ship ran aground on the Polish Bank, in the River Plate. She was on a voyage from Bremen to Buenos Aires, Argentina.
Dunorlan	United Kingdom	The barque was driven ashore and wrecked at Agger, Denmark. She was on a voyage from Grimsby, Lincolnshire to Brevik, Norway.
Express	United Kingdom	The ship ran aground on the North Tail Ridge and was wrecked. Her crew were rescued by the Appledore Lifeboat.
Mary Ann	United Kingdom	The schooner ran aground on the North Tail Ridge and sank. Her crew were rescued by the Appledore Lifeboat.
Norman	United Kingdom	The ship was wrecked at José Ignacio, Uruguay with the loss of nine of her crew. She was on a voyage from Liverpool to Montevideo, Uruguay.
Stag	United Kingdom	The ship ran aground on the English Bank, in the River Plate. She was on a voyage from Newport, Monmouthshire to a port in Uruguay.

== 5 April ==
List of shipwrecks: 5 April 1873
Ship	State	Description
Ægean	United Kingdom	The steamship ran aground on the Brouwers Reef, in the Java Sea. She was on a voyage from Kobe, Japan to Batavia, Netherlands East Indies. She was refloated on 6 March and resumed her voyage.
Feronia	United Kingdom	The ship caught fire at Fowey, Cornwall and was scuttled.
Foundling	United Kingdom	The schooner collided with the steamship Earl of Durham (United Kingdom) and sank in the River Thames at Gravesend, Kent. All on board survived.
James Hull	United States	The brig was driven ashore and wrecked at Cape Henlopen, Delaware. Her crew were rescued.
Jean Auguste	France	The schooner collided with the brig Countess (United Kingdom and foundered in the North Sea 8 nautical miles (15 km) north by west of the Dudgeon Lightship ( Trinity House). Her crew were rescued. Jean Auguste was on a voyage from Ouistreham, Pas-de-Calais to Leith, Lothian, United Kingdom.
Rose	United Kingdom	The smack was driven ashore and wrecked at Ryde, Isle of Wight. She was on a voyage from Rouen, Seine-Inférieure, France to Southampton, Hampshire.
Stella	United Kingdom	The yacht collided with a sloop in the River Thames and capsized with the loss of one of the two people on board.
Troubador	United Kingdom	The ship was driven ashore at Beaufort, United States. She was on a voyage from Santo Domingo Tonalá, Mexico to Queenstown, County Cork.

== 6 April ==
List of shipwrecks: 6 April 1873
Ship	State	Description
Alexandrana	United Kingdom	The ship ran aground on the Longsand, in the North Sea off the coast of Essex. She was on a voyage from Newcastle upon Tyne, Northumberland to Poole, Dorset. She was refloated and assisted in to Harwich, Essex in a leaky condition.
Caroline et Sire	Denmark	The ship was driven ashore at Sæby. She was on a voyage from Randers to Moss, Norway.
Helene	Germany	The brig foundered in the Atlantic Ocean. Her crew were rescued.
Hunter	United Kingdom	The schooner ran aground in the River Mersey. She was on a voyage from Glasgow, Renfrewshire to Liverpool, Lancashire. She was refloated with the assistance of the tug Knight Templar (United Kingdom) and taken in to Birkenhead, Cheshire.

== 7 April ==
List of shipwrecks: 7 April 1873
Ship	State	Description
Camana	United Kingdom	The full-rigged ship ran ashore at Clachland Point, Isle of Arran. She was on a voyage from Glasgow, Renfrewshire to San Francisco, California, United States. She was refloated with assistance from the tug Flying Squall (United Kingdom) and resumed her voyage.
Fidelia	United Kingdom	The steamship was wrecked at Cape Recife, Cape Colony. She was on a voyage from Mossel Bay to Port Elizabeth, Cape Colony.
India	United Kingdom	The steamship ran aground in the Clyde downstream of Dumbarton. She was on a voyage from Greenock, Renfrewshire to New York, United States. She was refloated the next day.
Rose	United Kingdom	The steamship ran aground at Kertch, Russia. She was on a voyage from Hull, Yorkshire to Kertch.
Thorwaldsen	Germany	The steamship ran aground and was wrecked on the Hollands-Vaderöe, off the coast of Sweden.

== 8 April ==
List of shipwrecks: 8 April 1873
Ship	State	Description
Africa	United Kingdom	The steamship ran aground in the Danube 40 nautical miles (74 km) from its mouth.
Dromedary	United Kingdom	The steamship foundered in the Irish Sea between the Tuskar Rock and Wicklow Head, County Wicklow. Her crew were rescued by the steamship Pernambuco (United Kingdom). Dromedary was on a voyage from Newport, Monmouthshire to Dublin.
Elm City	United States	The steamship was wrecked on the Stepping Stones Reef. All on board, more than 100 people, were rescued. She was on a voyage from New York to Newhaven, Connecticut.
Twa Broder	Sweden	The brig ran aground off Mönsterås. She was on a voyage from Mönsterås to an English port.
Zea	United Kingdom	The schooner ran aground in the Rabbit Islands, Ottoman Empire. She was refloated and resumed her voyage.

== 9 April ==
List of shipwrecks: 9 April 1873
Ship	State	Description
Forty-five	United Kingdom	The sailing barge foundered off St. Helen's, Isle of Wight with the loss of two of the four people on board. She was on a voyage from Portsmouth, Hampshire to Brading, Isle of Wight.

== 12 April ==
List of shipwrecks: 12 April 1873
Ship	State	Description
Batavier	Netherlands	The paddle steamer ran aground on the Red Sand, in the Thames Estuary. She was on a voyage from Rotterdam South Holland to London, United Kingdom. She was refloated and taken in to Gravesend, Kent, United Kingdom.
Dunkeld	United Kingdom	The ship was wrecked at Saugor, India. Her crew were rescued. She was on a voyage from Calcutta, India to Havre de Grâce, Seine-Inférieure, France.
Fiona	United Kingdom	The steamship suffered an onboard explosion and fire at Skomer, Pembrokeshire and sank at the stern. She was on a voyage from Liverpool, Lancashire to Newport, Monmouthshire. Fiona was refloated on 24 April and beached at Milford Haven.
Hakel Adelstein	Norway	The barque was driven ashore and wrecked at Hook of Holland, South Holland. Her crew were rescued.
Hjorring Ruhma	Germany	The schooner was driven ashore at "Kjobstad". She was on a voyage from Goole, Yorkshire, United Kingdom. She was later refloated and resumed her voyage.
Lourche	France	The ship ran aground and was wrecked at Saint-Louis, Senegal. She was on a voyage from Bordeaux, Gironde to Saint-Louis.
Macedone	United Kingdom	The steamship collided with the barque Solertia (Norway) and sank at Rotterdam.
Olive	United Kingdom	The barque was abandoned in the Atlantic Ocean. Her sixteen crew were rescued by George Hurlbut (United States).
Soli Deo Gloria	Germany	The ship was driven ashore on Saltholm, Denmark.

== 13 April ==
List of shipwrecks: 13 April 1873
Ship	State	Description
Aurora	Italy	The ship collided with the steamship Morocco (Flag unknown) and sank at Venice. Aurora was on a voyage from "Scarpa" to Venice.

== 15 April ==
List of shipwrecks: 15 April 1873
Ship	State	Description
Bremontier	France	The barque ran aground in the Hellegat, off the coast of Zeeland, Netherlands.
Isabelita	Spain	The barque was driven ashore on Scharhörn, Germany.
Triad	(United Kingdom of Great Britain and Ireland) Jersey	The schooner was wrecked on Island Davaar, Argyllshire. Her five crew were rescued. She was on a voyage from Saint-Malo, Ille-et-Vilaine, France to Campbeltown, Argyllshire. She was refloated on 5 May and towed into a port.

== 16 April ==
List of shipwrecks: 16 April 1873
Ship	State	Description
Mathilde	Spain	The steamship sprang a leak and was beached at "Santa Magdalena" and was severely damaged. She was on a voyage from Cette, Hérault, France to Sagunto and Valencia. She was refloated and taken in to Vinaròs in a leaky condition.
Three Sisters	United Kingdom	The yawl foundered in the North Sea off the coast of Fife. Her crew were rescued by a coble.

== 17 April ==
List of shipwrecks: 17 April 1873
Ship	State	Description
Juanita	Mexico	The schooner was wrecked near "Santecomapan". She was on a voyage from San Juan Bautista de Tabasco to Veracruz.

== 18 April ==
List of shipwrecks: 18 April 1873
Ship	State	Description
Ceres	Germany	The ship ran aground on the Gelbsand, in the North Sea. She was refloated with assistance on 21 April and taken in to Cuxhaven.
Galeed	United Kingdom	The steamship ran aground in the Danube.
Liverpool	United Kingdom	The brigantine was driven ashore on Orlock Point, County Down. She was on avoyage from Belfast, County Antrim to Maryport, Cumberland.
Olive	United Kingdom	The fishing vessel collided with Sir Walter Scott (United Kingdom) and sank off Kinsale, County Cork. Her crew were rescued.
Sea Bird	United Kingdom	The brigantine was wrecked on the Bishop Rock, Isles of Scilly. Her crew were rescued. She was on a voyage from a port in the west of England to Dublin.
Westoe	United Kingdom	The steamship ran aground in the Danube.

== 19 April ==
List of shipwrecks: 19 April 1873
Ship	State	Description
Ferdinand	United States	The ship was destroyed by fire at Pensacola, Florida.
Leonardo da Vinci	Italy	The barque was wrecked on the Playa Santa Rosa. Her crew were rescued.
Magdalene Esther	United Kingdom	The schooner collided with the steamship Neapel (Germany) and sank in the River Usk. She was on a voyage from Newport, Monmouthshire to Cork. Magdalene Esther was refloated on 29 April.
West Wind	United States	The steamboat sank in the Arkansas River downstream of Little Rock, Arkansas. She was on a voyage from Fort Smith, Arkansas to New Orleans, Louisiana.

== 20 April ==
List of shipwrecks: 20 April 1873
Ship	State	Description
Eros	United Kingdom	The steamship ran aground in the Queen's Channel. She was on a voyage from Odesa, Russia to Waterford.
Lochinvar	United Kingdom	The barque collided with the transport ship Loiret (French Navy) and sank in the North Sea off Orfordness, Suffolk. Her crew were rescued by Loire. Lochinvar was on a voyage from the River Tyne to Cartagena, Spain.

== 21 April ==
List of shipwrecks: 21 April 1873
Ship	State	Description
Arundel Castle	United Kingdom	The schooner was driven ashore at Scotstown Head, Aberdeenshire. She was on a voyage from Wick, Caithness to Leith, Lothian.
Zacharias	Germany	The brig capsized at Swansea, Glamorgan, United Kingdom.

== 22 April ==
List of shipwrecks: 22 April 1873
Ship	State	Description
Maria	Greece	The brig was abandoned in the Atlantic Ocean 30 nautical miles (56 km) south south west of the Isles of Scilly, United Kingdom. Her nine crew were rescued by Tertius (United Kingdom).

== 23 April ==
List of shipwrecks: 23 April 1873
Ship	State	Description
Bacciccia	Italy	The barque was driven ashore on Governor's Island, New York City, United States. She was on a voyage from Agrigento, Sicily to New York City. Bacciccia was refloated and taken in to Brooklyn, where she was drydocked.
Harmanna	Netherlands	The schooner struck a rock off Alderney, Channel Islands and was abandoned. All eight people on board were rescued by the cutter Favourite ( (United Kingdom of Great Britain and Ireland) ). Harmana was on a voyage from Bari, Italy to Saint Petersburg, Russia.
M. A. Herrers	France	The ship was driven ashore at Cape Henry, Virginia, United States.
Nebula	United Kingdom	The barque ran aground at Port Eynon Point, Glamorgan and was severely damaged. Her crew were rescued. She was on a voyage from Antwerp, Belgium to Cardiff, Glamonrgan. Nebula was refloated the next day and taken in to Swansea, Glamorgan. She was repaired and returned to service.

== 24 April ==
List of shipwrecks: 24 April 1873
Ship	State	Description
Dilkoosh	United States	The ship ran aground in the Hudson River. She was on a voyage from New York to London, United Kingdom.
Durham	United Kingdom	The steamship ran aground in the Thames Estuary off Higham, Kent. She was on a voyage from Reval, Russia to London. She was refloated and taken in to Gravesend, Kent.
Fly	United Kingdom	The fishing boat capsized and sank off the Covesea Skerries Lighthouse with the loss of four of her six crew. Survivors were rescued by Press Home (United Kingdom). Fly was on a voyage from Pembrey, Carmarthenshire to Newport, Pembrokeshire.

== 25 April ==
List of shipwrecks: 25 April 1873
Ship	State	Description
Abel	Norway	The barque ran aground in the Dardanelles. She was on a voyage from South Shields, County Durham, United Kingdom to Odesa, Russia. She was refloated with the assistance of a tug.
Garland	United Kingdom	The ship ran aground off Millbay, Devon. She was on a voyage from Plymouth, Devon to A Coruña, Spain.
Gessa	Flag unknown	The ship was wrecked at "Cogbrinas". Her crew were rescued.
Pride of the Nile	United Kingdom	The smack collided with the smack Marble or Warbler (United Kingdom and was abandoned off the Dutch coast. Her crew were rescued.

== 26 April ==
List of shipwrecks: 26 April 1873
Ship	State	Description
Zouave	United Kingdom	The schooner was wrecked 22 nautical miles (41 km) north of the mouth of the Rio Grande do Sul with the loss of a crew member. She was on a voyage from Liverpool, Lancashire to the Rio Grande do Sul.

== 27 April ==
List of shipwrecks: 27 April 1873
Ship	State	Description
Glendale	United Kingdom	The steamship was wrecked on the Goodwin Sands, Kent. Her 23 crew were rescued by the lugger Florence Nightingale (United Kingdom). Glendale was on a voyage from South Shields, County Durham to Reggio Calabria, Italy.
Peter	United Kingdom	The full-rigged ship was run into and sank with the loss of all but one of her crew. The survivor was rescued by August and Marie (Sweden).
Proctor	United Kingdom	The smack collided with the smack Flirt (United Kingdom) and sank in the North Sea.

== 28 April ==
List of shipwrecks: 28 April 1873
Ship	State	Description
Jeannie and Mathilda	France	The barque collided with the steamship Liberia (United Kingdom) and sank off "Appam", Africa with loss of life. Jeannie and Mathilda was on a voyage from Calais to the Bight of Benin.
Jeverland	Germany	The barque was wrecked at Akyab, Burma. Her crew were rescued. She was on a voyage from Mauritius to Akyab.
John Ericsson	Sweden	The full-rigged ship was wrecked at Akyab. Her crew were rescued. She was on a voyage from Akyab to Falmouth, Cornwall, United Kingdom.
Kildare	United Kingdom	The brig sprang a leak and foundered in the Bristol Channel. Her crew were rescued by Canada (United Kingdom). Kildare was on a voyage from Bône, Algeria to Swansea, Glamorgan.
Vittorio	Italy	The barque ran aground off La Atunara, Spain and was abandoned by her crew. She was towed in to Gibraltar the next day by HMS Barracouta (Royal Navy).

== 29 April ==
List of shipwrecks: 29 April 1873
Ship	State	Description
Emmanuel	France	The ship was wrecked on the Horse Bank, in the Irish Sea off the coast of Lancashire, United Kingdom. Her crew were rescued by the Lytham Lifeboat. She was on a voyage from Preston, Lancashire to Rochefort, Charente-Inférieure.
Maracaibo	United Kingdom	The steamship capsized in the Clyde. She was righted on 1 May and taken in to Port Glasgow, Renfrewshire.
Margaret	United Kingdom	The schooner ran aground on the Corton Sands, in the North Sea off the coast of Suffolk. She was on a voyage from Dartmouth, Devon to Grimsby, Lincolnshire. She was refloated with the assistance of a tug and taken in tow for Great Yarmouth, Norfolk but consequently sank.
Medallion	United Kingdom	The barque ran aground on the Kerken Banks, in the Mediterranean Sea 50 nautical miles (93 km) from Sfax, Beylik of Tunis. She was on a voyage from Tripoli, Vilayet of Tripolitania to Newcastle upon Tyne, Northumberland.
Plato	United Kingdom	The barque was wrecked on a reef off New Caledonia. Her crew survived the wreck, and reached Malaita, Solomon Islands in a boat. They were attacked by the local inhabitants and all but one of the crew were murdered. The survivor was rescued two months later by HMS Renard (Royal Navy). Plato was on a voyage from Newcastle, New South Wales to Hong Kong.
Sisters	United Kingdom	The schooner foundered off Padstow, Cornwall. Her crew were rescued. She was on a voyage from Newport, Monmouthshire to Newquay, Cornwall.
Tri-Adelphoi	Greece	The ship struck the breakwater and sank at Kertch, Russia. She was on a voyage from Messina, Sicily, Italy to Taganrog, Russia.

== Unknown date ==
List of shipwrecks: Unknown date in April 1873
Ship	State	Description
Alpha	United States	The brig was driven ashore at the mouth of the Chesapeake River. She was on a voyage from Baltimore, Maryland to Puerto Rico. She was later refloated and towed in to Baltimore.
Ann and Mary	United Kingdom	The ship was driven ashore at "Penmaen Point". Her crew were rescued. She was on a voyage from Milford Haven to Abercastle, Pembrokeshire.
Annie Grieve	Canada	The schooner was wrecked. She was on a voyage from Ponce, Puerto Rico to Baltimore, Maryland.
Argo	New Zealand	The 32-ton schooner left Auckland for Whangārei with four crew on board, and was not seen again.
Bella Cathrina, or Ellen Catrina	United Kingdom	The ship was abandoned in the Atlantic Ocean before 2 April.
Blencathra	United Kingdom	The ship sprang a leak and was abandoned in the Atlantic Ocean. Her crew were rescued. She was on a voyage from Pensacola, Florida to Plymouth, Devon.
Columbine	United Kingdom	The ship was driven ashore near Cahore, County Wexford. She was on a voyage from Dublin to Wexford. She was refloated and was towed in to Wexfored in a leaky condition.
Earl of Dufferin	United Kingdom	The steamship ran aground and sank off Porto, Portugal. Her crew were rescued. She was on a voyage from Liverpool, Lancashire to Porto.
E. C. Redman	United States	The brig was wrecked on the Isle of Pines, Cuba.
Elizabeth Kimball	United States	The clipper sprang a leak and was beached on Easter Island after 20 April. She was on a voyage from Port Gamble, Washington to Iquique, Chile. A schooner was built from the wreck, and ten of the twenty people departed on 29 July for Tahiti, which was reached in 24 days. The remaining ten people were subsequently rescued by a French steamship.
Expertus	United Kingdom	The brig was wrecked at Glades Scituate, Bermuda before 15 April. Her crew were rescued.
Fidelite	Flag unknown	The ship was wrecked on the Hogsty Reef. Her crew were rescued. She was on a voyage from the Rio de la Hacha to Falmouth, Cornwall, United Kingdom.
Friends	United Kingdom	The ship was driven ashore on Öland, Sweden before 15 April. She was on a voyage from Newcastle upon Tyne to Stockholm, Sweden. She was refloated and completed her voyage.
Glenalladale	United Kingdom	The ship was abandoned in the Atlantic Ocean before 17 April. Her crew were rescued. She was on a voyage from Halifax, Nova Scotia, Canada to Liverpool.
Hamburg	Germany	The fishing smack collided with another vessel and was abandoned in the Dogger Bank before 19 April. She was subsequently discovered by the fishing smack Swanwick (United Kingdom) and taken in to Grimsby, Lincolnshire.
Harmingja	United States	The ship caught fire and was abandoned at sea before 15 April. Her crew were rescued. She was on a voyage from New Orleans, Louisiana, United States to Reval, Russia.
Henriette	France	The ship struck rocks off Flores Island, Azores, whilst on a voyage from Bordeaux, Gironde to Montevideo, Uruguay. She completed her voyage in a leaky condition.
Henry	United Kingdom	The ship was driven ashore at Blakeney, Norfolk.
Hopeful	United Kingdom	The ship foundered off the coast of Finistère, France.
Juanita	Mexico	The ship was wrecked on the Anegadilla, off Veracruz before 6 April. She was on a voyage from Liverpool to Veracruz.
Kiang Loong	China	The steamship ran aground and broke her back before 11 April.
Marie Claire	United Kingdom	The schooner was driven ashore at Garrucha, Spain.
Phoenix	France	The ship was driven ashore. She was on a voyage from "Touricareah" to Marseille, Bouches-du-Rhône. She was refloated and taken in to a port in Sierra Leone, where she arrived on 1 May. Subsequently repaired and returned to service.
Rachel Blackwood	United Kingdom	The ship was damaged by fire at Demerara, British Guiana.
Reichstag	Germany	The ship was abandoned in the Atlantic Ocean before 4 April. Her crew were rescued. She was on a voyage from Santos, Brazil to Falmouth.
Reyna de los Cieles	Spain	The ship was destroyed by fire at "Cabezuela", near Cádiz.
Ruby	United Kingdom	The ship ran aground at Duncannon, County Wexford. She was refloated and resumed her voyage.
Snow Queen	United Kingdom	The ship ran aground in the Delaware River. She was on a voyage from Liverpool to Philadelphia, Pennsylvania, United States.
Southampton	United Kingdom	The full-rigged ship was destroyed by fire 250 nautical miles (460 km) off Cape Hatteras, North Carolina, United States. Her seventeen crew were rescued. She was on a voyage from New Orleans to Reval.
Storm King	United States	The ship foundered. She was on a voyage from Pensacola, Florida to Liverpool.
Unico N.	Ottoman Empire	The ship was wrecked near Antioch. She was on a voyage from Alexandria, Egypt to Mersin.
Vesper	United Kingdom	The fishing vessel foundered off Ameland, Friesland, Netherlands.
