= Satellite-class sloop =

Class of 12-gun composite sloops built for the Royal Navy between 1883 and 1888

- Satellite

Class overview
- Name: Satellite-class sloops
- Builders: Devonport Dockyard; Sheerness Dockyard
- Operators: Royal Navy; Irish Free State
- Cost: £62,900 (Satellite) - £71,000 (Caroline)
- Built: 1883–1888
- In commission: 1883–1947
- Completed: 7

General characteristics
- Displacement: 1,420 tons
- Length: 200 ft (61 m)
- Beam: 38 ft (12 m)
- Draught: 15.7 ft (4.8 m)
- Installed power: 1,400 hp (1,044 kW)
- Propulsion: Horizontal compound expansion steam engine; Single screw
- Sail plan: Barque-rigged
- Range: Approximately 6,000 nmi (11,000 km) at 10 kn (19 km/h)
- Complement: 170-200
- Armament: As designed: Two BL 6-inch/100-pounder (81cwt) Mk II guns; Ten BL 5-inch (127.0 mm) 50-pounder (38cwt) guns; One light gun; Four machine guns; Heroine, Hyacinth, Royalist & Satellite: Eight BL 6-inch/100-pounder (81cwt) Mk II guns; One 7-pdr landing gun; Four machine guns
- Armour: Internal steel deck over machinery and magazines

The Satellite class was a class of 12-gun composite sloops built for the Royal Navy between 1883 and 1888, and reclassified as corvettes in 1884.

== Construction ==
=== Design ===
Designed by Nathaniel Barnaby, the Royal Navy Director of Naval Construction, the hull was of composite construction; that is, iron keel, frames, stem and stern posts with wooden planking. This class of composite sloops was unique in having an internal steel deck over the machinery and magazines for protection. The Satellite class were reclassified as corvettes in 1884, and no more composite or wooden corvettes were built - in fact, Pylades was the last corvette built for the Royal Navy until the Second World War.

=== Propulsion ===
Propulsion was provided by a horizontal compound expansion of 1,400 indicated horsepower (1,044 kW) driving a single screw.

=== Sail plan ===
All the ships of the class were built with a barque rig.

=== Armament ===
The class was designed with two 6-inch/100-pounder (81cwt) breech loaders and ten 5-inch/50-pounder (38cwt) breech loaders, plus a single light gun and four (or more) machine guns. Heroine, Hyacinth and Royalist were built with eight 6-inch/100-pounder (81cwt) breech loaders in place of the 5-inch/6-inch mixture, and Satellite was converted to the same fit.

== Ships ==
Name	Ship Builder	Launched	Fate
Satellite	Sheerness Dockyard	13 August 1881	RNVR drill ship at North Shields on the River Tyne in 1904. Sold to J G Potts for breaking on 21 October 1947
Heroine	Devonport Dockyard	3 December 1881	Sold to King of Bristol for breaking on 28 August 1902
Hyacinth	Devonport Dockyard	20 December 1881	Sold to King of Bristol for breaking on 25 August 1902
Royalist	Devonport Dockyard	7 March 1883	Hulk in February 1900. Renamed Colleen on 1 December 1913 and transferred to the Irish Free State Government on 19 February 1923
Rapid	Devonport Dockyard	21 March 1883	Hulk in 1906. Became a coal hulk in 1912 and was renamed C7. Became an accommodation ship in 1916 and was renamed Hart. Sold at Gibraltar in 1948
Caroline	Sheerness Dockyard	25 November 1882	Hulk in 1897. Became a training ship in April 1908 and was renamed Ganges. Renamed Powerful III in September 1913 and Impregnable IV in November 1919. Sold on 31 August 1929
Pylades	Sheerness Dockyard	5 November 1884	Sold to Cohen of Felixstowe for breaking on 3 April 1906.

== Operational lives ==
These ships were designed to patrol the far-flung reaches of Britain's maritime empire, and so Rapid and Royalist both went to the Australian Station, Satellite to the Pacific Station, Pylades to the North America and West Indies Station and Heroine, Caroline and Hyacinth all to the China Station.
