= HMS Rapid (1883) =

Sloop of the Royal Navy

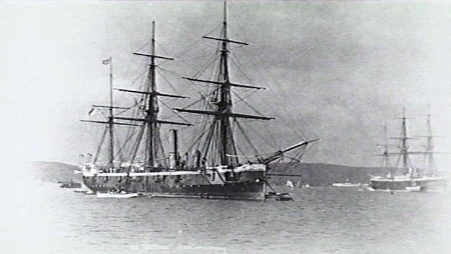
- HMS Rapid anchored at Farm Cove, Sydney c. 1888.

History

United Kingdom
- Name: HMS Rapid
- Builder: Devonport Dockyard
- Laid down: 21 April 1881
- Launched: 21 March 1883
- Commissioned: 9 September 1884
- Renamed: Hart in 1916
- Fate: Hulked in 1906; Converted to a coal hulk in 1912; Submarine Depot Ship 1912-1016; Accommodation ship in 1916; Sold at Gibraltar in 1948

General characteristics
- Class & type: Satellite-class sloop
- Displacement: 1,420 tons
- Length: 200 ft (61 m) pp
- Beam: 38 ft (12 m)
- Draught: 15 ft 9 in (4.80 m)
- Installed power: 1,470 ihp (1,096 kW)
- Propulsion: Single horizontal compound-expansion steam engine; Single screw
- Sail plan: Barque-rigged
- Range: Approximately 6,000 nmi (11,000 km) at 10 kn (19 km/h)
- Complement: 170–200
- Armament: Eight BL 6-inch/100-pounder (81cwt) Mk II guns; One light gun; Four machine guns
- Armour: Internal steel deck over machinery and magazines

HMS Rapid was a Satellite-class composite screw sloop of the Royal Navy, built at Devonport Dockyard and launched on 21 March 1883. She was later reclassified as a corvette.

Initially on service with the Cape of Good Hope and West Africa Station, Rapid commenced service on the Australia Station in 1886. She was recommissioned three times in Sydney before leaving the Australia Station on 1 December 1897. In March 1902, it was announced that she would be sold out of service owing to defects in her machinery. Six months later, she was instead posted to Gibraltar where she arrived for dockyard work in September 1902. Hulked in 1906, she was converted into a coal hulk in 1912 and was renamed C7. She became an accommodation ship in 1916 and was renamed Hart. She was sold at Gibraltar in 1948.
