= José Ignacio Torreblanca =

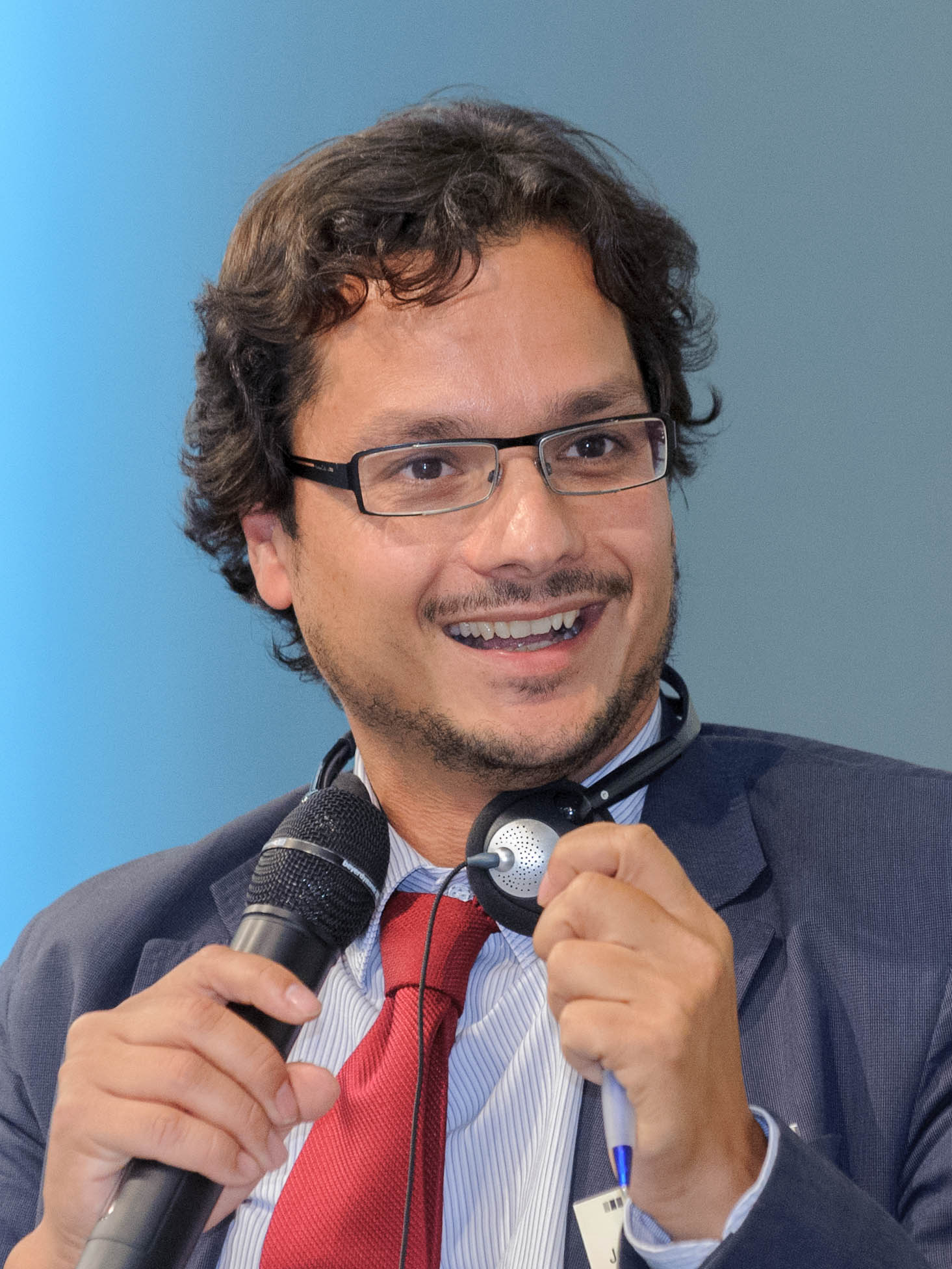
- Born: 1968; Madrid
- Alma mater: Complutense University of Madrid
- Occupation: Political analyst, journalist
- Employer: El Mundo (2018–); El País (2008–2018); Elcano Royal Institute (2004–2007); Elliott School of International Affairs; European Council on Foreign Relations (2007–); European University Institute; National University of Distance Education
- Awards: 'Salvador de Madariaga' Journalism Prize (2015)

José Ignacio Torreblanca Payá (born 1968) is a Spanish political analyst and political scientist. Working as opinion writer for El Mundo since 2018, he was the op-ed editor of El País from 2016 to 2018.

== Biography ==
Born in 1968 in Madrid, he earned a PhD in political science at the Complutense University of Madrid (UCM). He is full professor of the Universidad Nacional de Educación a Distancia (UNED). He has been a researcher for the Elcano Royal Institute.

Torreblanca became a regular columnist for El País in 2008. A noted europeanist, he also was the director of the Madrid office of the European Council on Foreign Relations (ECFR) think tank. In June 2016, he became the director of opinion of El País.

After Soledad Gallego-Díaz became the new editor-in-chief of El País in June 2018, Torreblanca left the newspaper and was replaced as op-ed editor by Máriam Martínez-Bascuñán. Torreblanca subsequently joined El Mundo as opinion writer in September 2018.

== Awards ==
- Salvador de Madariaga Prize; written press (2015)

== Works ==
- — (2001). The Reuniting of Europe: Promises, Negotiations and Compromises. London: Ashgate.
- — (2011). La fragmentación del poder europeo. Madrid: Icaria.
- — (2014). ¿Quién gobierna en Europa? Reconstruir la democracia, recuperar a la ciudadanía. Madrid: Catarata.
- — (2015). Asaltar los cielos. Podemos o la política después de la crisis. Barcelona: Debate.
