= José Ignacio "Papi" Tovar =

Colombian musician

José Ignacio "Papi" Tovar (22 June 1922, in Neiva, Huila – 6 February 2007) was a Colombian singer-songwriter. He won the concurso nacional de composición Jorge Villamil Cordovez, with his song "Sentimiento" in 1983.
