= Laguna José Ignacio =

Lagoon on the Atlantic seashore in Uruguay

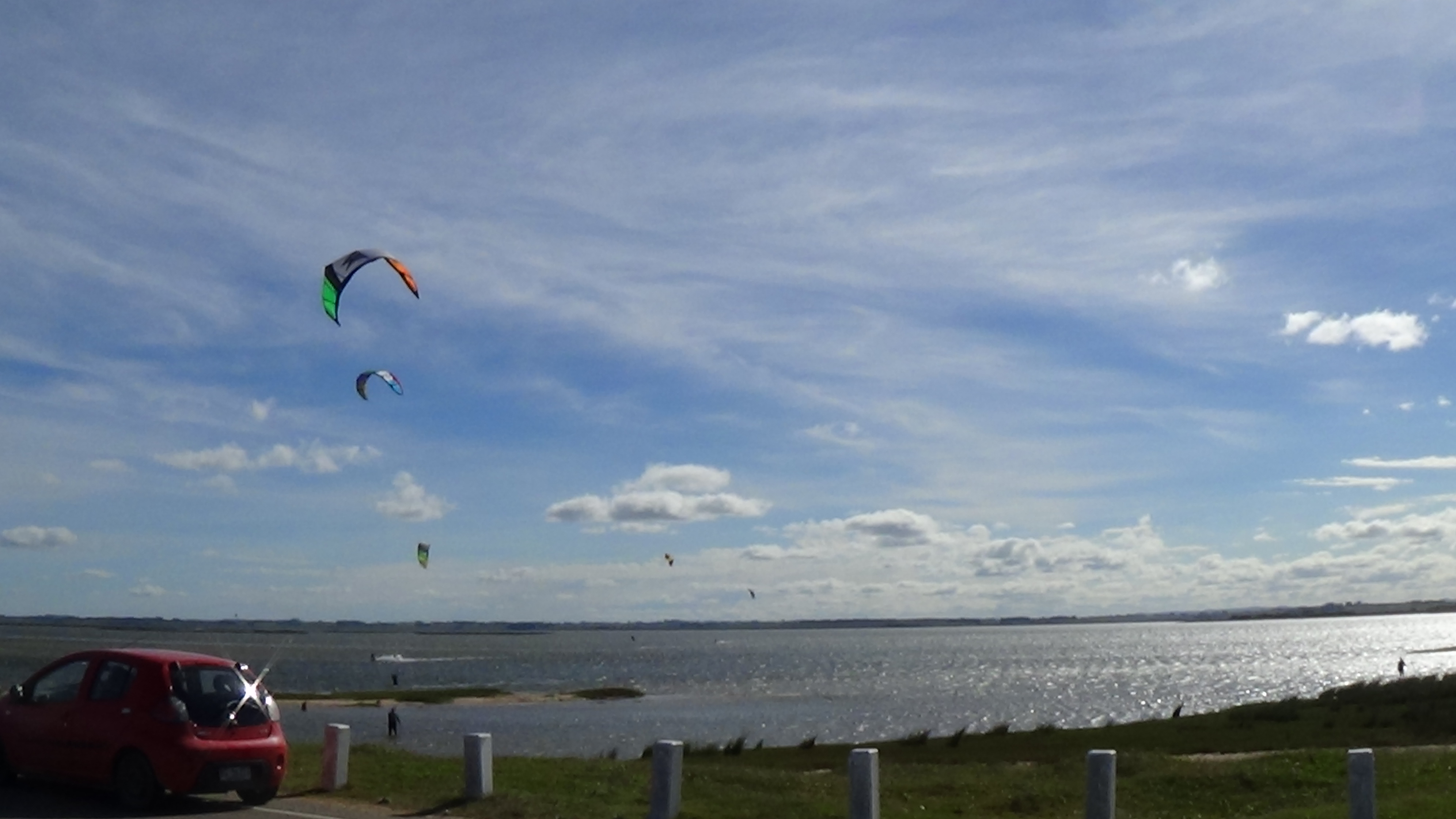
- Kitesurfing in José Ignacio.

- Location within Uruguay Location within South America
- Location: Maldonado Department, Uruguay
- Coordinates: 34°49′34″S 54°42′09″W
- Surface area: 14 square kilometres (5.4 sq mi)

Laguna José Ignacio (José Ignacio Lagoon) is a body of water located in Maldonado Department, Uruguay. A sandbank separates it from the Atlantic Ocean. The nearest seaside resort is José Ignacio.

== Environment ==
The lagoon is an important birdwatching location. It has been designated an Important Bird Area (IBA) by BirdLife International because it supports significant populations of non-breeding Chilean flamingos, wintering Olrog's gulls, and resident bay-capped wren-spinetails and black-and-white monjitas.
