= José Ignacio Iruretagoyena =

Spanish politician (1963 – 1998)

José Ignacio Iruretagoyena (1963 – 1998) was a Spanish politician and victim of terrorism of the Basque separatist group Euskadi Ta Askatasuna (ETA).

== Biography ==
ETA killed José Ignacio Iruretagoyena in Zarauz on January 9, 1998. He was a woodworker and Councillor of People's Party in the city of Zarauz. He was married, and he had two children. At the time of his murder, he was 35 years old.

=== Murder ===
In the weeks leading up to January 8, 1998, ETA's member Gregorio Escudero Balerdi monitored José Ignacio Iruretagoyena. The information obtained from these surveillances was also passed it to ETA's members Francisco Javier García Gaztelu, alias Txapote and Irantzu Gallastegui Sodupe, alias Amaya. Gregorio Escudero moved Garcia Gaztelu and Irantzu Gallastegui from the town of Andoain to Añorga's halt. From there, they took a train to Zarautz.

Once in Zarauz and on the information they had., they localized Jose Ignacio Iruretagoyena's vehicle. The vehicle was parked in a parking place. Irantzu Gallastegui set an explosive device placed under the seat of the driver. The device, manufactured by ETA, contained between 1.5 and 2 kilograms of ammonal and chloratite, and a timer. Txapote was surveillance the area while Amaya was setting up the bomb. The two ETA's members returned by train, being picked up in the halt of Añorga and transferred to Andoain's town by Gregorio Escudero.

On January 9, 1998, at 7:40 a.m. José Ignacio Iruretagoyena took his car and head to his job. After driving for a few meters, the artifact exploded around 7:50 a.m. at Urdaneta's street. As soon as the explosion was produced several passers-by found José Ignacio, who had lost several limbs of the body. The victim asked for help in Basque's language. They tried to revive him without success. The explosion caused injuries to a passer-by, witness of what happened, damage to a nearby building, another vehicle and the road. The Police cordoned off the area. Then, the judge proceeded to lift the corpse. The Basque City Halls made silent concentrations to convict the assassination.

The second section of the room of Criminal Court issued decision 22/2006, on May 18, 2006, in which it condemned Gregorio Escudero Balerdi to 42 years of prison. He obtained 25 years for terrorist murder and 17 years for a crime of terrorist havoc. He was also sentenced to economically compensate the heirs of José Ignacio Iruretagoyena for an amount of 120,000 euros. Also, this resolution also established the prohibition for the convicted person to return to Zarauz for the next five years and the payment of damages that caused by the attack.

This section also agreed on the conclusion of the proceedings and the opening of oral proceedings for Francisco Javier Garcia Gaztelu and Irantzu Gallastegui Sodupe. After the oral hearing, the decision 78/2009, issued December 17, sentenced each one of them to 46 years in prison. They obtained 18 years for a crime of terrorist murder and 18 years for another crime of terrorist havoc. They were also forbidden from approaching the town of Zarauz or the residence of the victims and keep a distance of 500m. They were sentenced to an economic compensation of 200,000 euros to his widow and 100,000 euros to each of José Ignacio's sons, as well as to cope with the damage caused by the attack.

After this attack, ETA claimed their crime through a statement published in the newspaper, Egin.

Years later, ETA tried to kill the dome of the Basque People's Party during a tribute to José Ignacio Iruretagoyena at the graveyard of Zarauz.

== Bibliography ==
- Merino, A., Chapa, A., Roots of liberty. pp. 151–159. FPEV (2011). ISBN 978-84-615-0648-4
