= Máriam Martínez-Bascuñán =

Spanish political scientist

Máriam Martínez-Bascuñán Ramírez
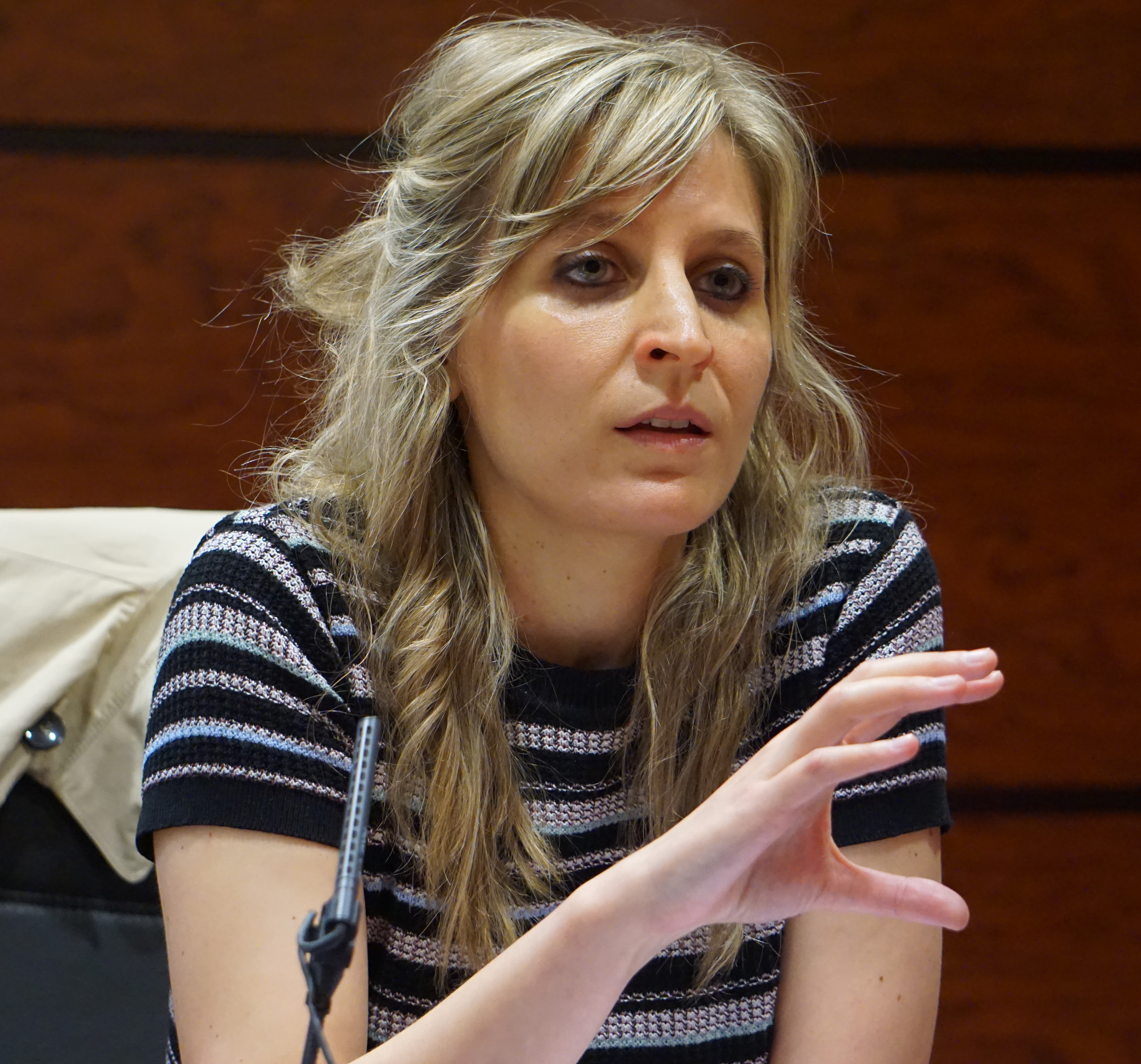
- Occupations: Political scientist; Newspaper director

Máriam Martínez-Bascuñán Ramírez is a Spanish political scientist. She is a professor of political science and international relations at the Autonomous University of Madrid. She specializes in feminist political theory and the study of populism. In 2018, she became the Opinion Director of the newspaper El País.

== Life and career ==
Martínez-Bascuñán studied law and political science at the Autonomous University of Madrid, where she received a doctorate in Political Science under the supervision of Rafael del Águila Tejerina (es). She also studied political science at Sciences Po, as well as with Iris Marion Young at The University of Chicago, and with Jean L. Cohen at Columbia University.

Martínez-Bascuñán is a Professor of Political Science and International Relations at the Autonomous University of Madrid, where she specializes in feminist political theory. She also studies the theory of gender and politics, populism, deliberative democracy, and migration policy. In 2012, she published a book about the political theory of Iris Marion Young, called Género, emancipación y diferencia(s). La teoría política de Iris Marion Young. She was also a coauthor, with Fernando Vallespín (es), of a 2017 book on populism, called Populismos.

In addition to her academic work, she has actively published opinion articles in popular media on subjects related to her academic specialties. In 2016, she became a columnist for the newspaper El País. In June 2018, she was named the Opinion Director of the newspaper.
