= Sanjuán (footballer) =

Spanish footballer and manager

Personal information
- Full name: José Ignacio López Sanjuán
- Date of birth: 1 April 1940 (age 86)
- Place of birth: Villaobispo de Otero, Spain
- Position: Defender

Senior career*
Years	Team	Apps	(Gls)
1960–1962	Basconia	23	(0)
1962–1964	Valladolid	3	(0)
1964–1966	Langreo	19	(0)
1966–1967	Gimnàstic		
- Terrassa
- Gimnàstic

Managerial career
- Gimnàstic (assistant)
- 1973–1975: Vinaròs
- 1975–1976: Villarreal
- 1976–1977: Gimnàstic
- 1977–1978: Lleida
- 1978–1980: Cultural Leonesa
- 1980–1981: Pontevedra
- 1981–1983: Vinaròs
- 1983–1984: Tortosa
- 1985–1986: Cultural Leonesa
- 1988: Eldense
- 1989: Poli Almería
- 1989–1990: Burriana
- 1990–1992: Villarreal
- 1996–1997: Ponferradina
- * Club domestic league appearances and goals

José Ignacio López Sanjuán (born 1 April 1940) is a Spanish retired footballer who played as a defender, and a current coach.

== Playing career ==
Born in Villaobispo de Otero, León, Castile and León, Sanjuán made his senior debut with CD Basconia on 6 November 1960, starting in a 1–0 away win against Terrassa FC in the Segunda División.

In the 1962 Sanjuán moved to La Liga with Real Valladolid. He made his debut in the competition on 14 April 1963, playing the full 90 minutes in a 2–1 home win against Atlético Madrid.

After appearing rarely Sanjuán returned to the second level, joining UP Langreo. In 1966 he left the club and subsequently resumed his career in the Tercera División, representing Gimnàstic de Tarragona (two stints) and Terrassa FC.

== Post-playing career ==
After being an assistant manager at his last club Gimnàstic, Sanjuán was appointed manager of Vinaròs CF in 1973. He subsequently returned to Nàstic, being manager of the club in 1976.

In July 1977 Sanjuán was named manager of Catalonia neighbours UE Lleida. He subsequently returned to Vinaròs in 1981, and remained in the fourth and third levels for the following seasons, coaching CD Tortosa, Cultural y Deportiva Leonesa, CD Eldense, Polideportivo Almería and CD Burriana.

In May 1990 Sanjuán was appointed at the helm of Villarreal CF, with the side in the fourth level. With the Yellow Submarine he achieved two consecutive promotions, taking the club back to the second division after a 20-year absence.

Sanjuán was also in charge of SD Ponferradina during the 1996–97 campaign, being sacked in January 1997.
