= José Ignacio, Uruguay =

José Ignacio
- Seaside resort
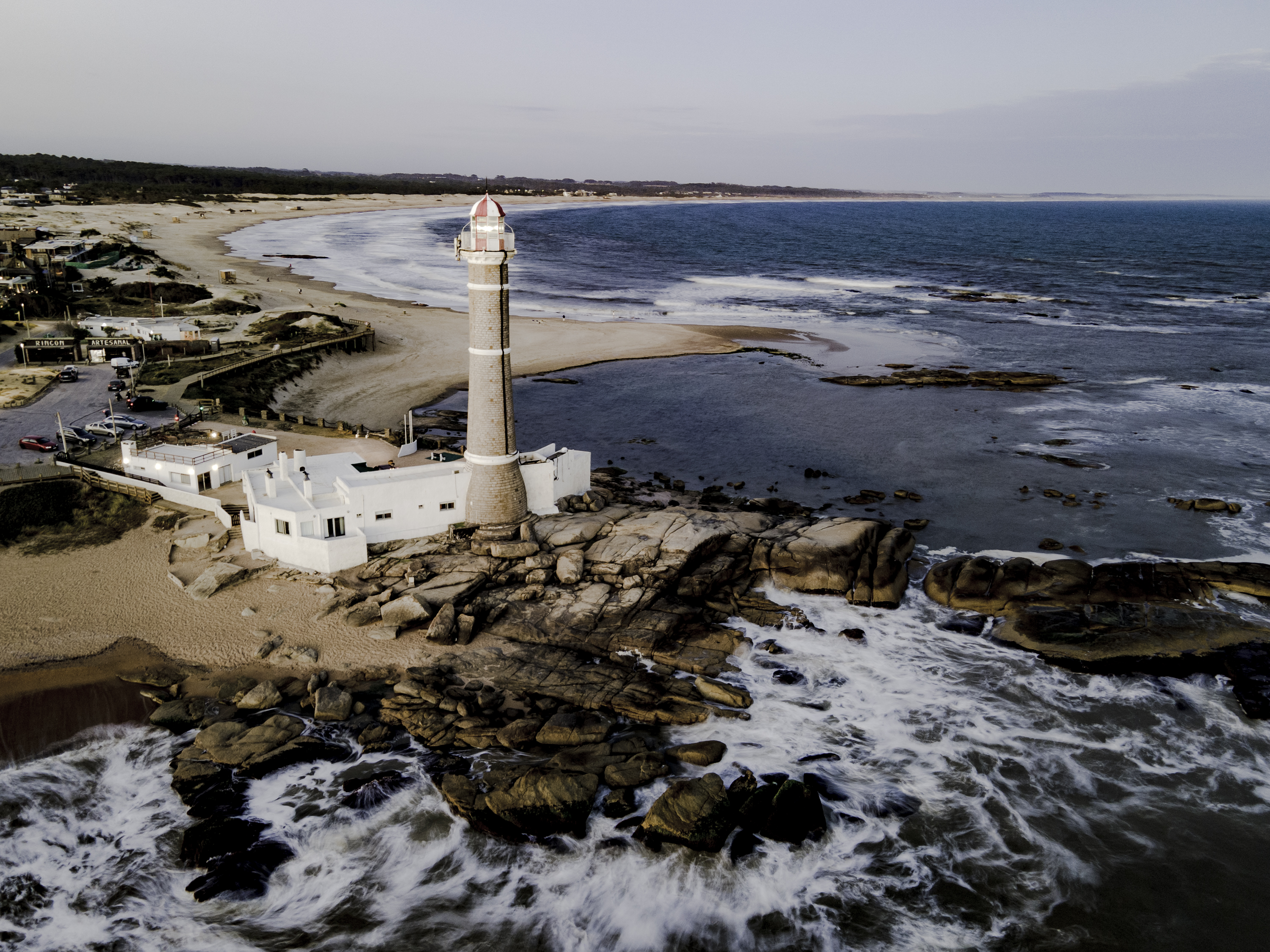
- Punta José Ignacio lighthouse in December 2020.

- Location in Uruguay
- Coordinates: 34°50′47″S 54°38′00″W
- Country: Uruguay
- Department: Maldonado Department

Population (2011)
  - Total: 292
- Time zone: UTC -3
- Postal code: 20402
- Dial plan: +598 42 (+6 digits)

José Ignacio is a resort (balneario) in the Maldonado Department of southeastern Uruguay.

== Geography ==
The resort is located on the coast of the Atlantic Ocean, on Route 10, east of José Ignacio Lagoon.

A notable feature is the Punta José Ignacio Lighthouse.

== History ==
In April 1873 the British ship Norman got wrecked near José Ignacio. In the 2020s, the town became an arts destination.

== Population ==
In 2011 José Ignacio had a population of 292 permanent inhabitants.
