= Jose Fernandez Dubrock =

Chilean engineer & politician

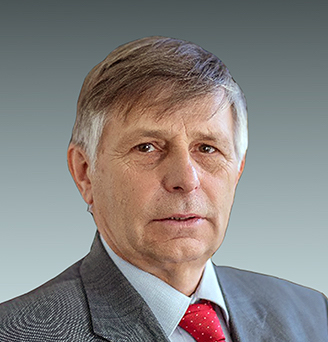
- Official portrait of José Fernández Dübrock as Mayor in 2019.

Intendant of the Region of Magallanes and Chilean Antarctica
- In office 13 February 2019 – 21 September 2020
- Preceded by: María Teresa Castañon
- Succeeded by: Jennifer Rojas Garcia

Regional Ministerial Secretary of Ministry of Agriculture of Chile
- In office 11 March 2018 – 13 February 2019
- Preceded by: Etel Latorre Varas
- Succeeded by: Alfonso Roux Pittet

Personal details
- Born: Magallanes, Chile
- Party: Independent
- Education: Universidad de Chile
- Occupation: Forestry engineer and politician

José Adolfo Fernández Dübrock is a Chilean forest engineer and politician of German descent. Between 2019 and 2020 he served as Mayor of the Region of Magallanes and Chilean Antarctica, under the second government of Sebastián Piñera.

== Career ==
He graduated as a forestry engineer from the University of Chile.

He served as Regional Director of the CONAF of Magallanes during the first government of President Sebastián Piñera and as Regional Counselor for 12 years.

In 2018, he assumed Seremi de Agricultura de Magallanes y la Antártica Chilena, a position he held until his appointment as Mayor of that region. He stepped down from this responsibility on 21 September 2020.
