= José Ignacio Ustarán =

Spanish politician (1939 - 1980)

José Ignacio Ustarán Ramírez
- Born: 1939; Vitoria-Gasteiz, Spain
- Died: September 29, 1980; Vitoria-Gasteiz, Spain
- Cause of death: Assassination by ETA
- Occupations: Politician, industrial expert
- Political party: UCD
- Spouse: Yes
- Children: 4

José Ignacio Ustarán Ramírez (Vitoria, 1939 – Vitoria, 1980) was a Spanish politician, candidate for UCD in the first elections for the Basque Parliament, and a mortal victim of the Basque separatist organization ETA on September 29, 1980.

== Biography ==
Jose Ignacio was an industrial expert and had worked in the automobile industry. He was a candidate for the UCD in the first elections to the Basque Parliament, held in 1980, and belonged to the executive committee of UCD of Alava. He was married and was the father of four children.

=== Murder ===
On September 29, 1980, around 9 p.m. the assassins called at the door of Ustarán's family home saying that they were going to deliver a package. The delivery did not surprise the family since they were preparing a celebration for the following day in honour of his daughter. A young man appeared when they opened the door, then immediately two other men armed with guns and with their faces uncovered showed up at the door. Once inside, they forced Jose Ignacio to lie on the ground while his spouse and their four children were taken to another room, where the men warned the family not to call the police until midnight. The spouse asked the men what were they planning to do to José Ignacio. One of the men replied that it had yet to be decided and that they were going to talk about it. Ten minutes later, the spouse left the room to check if they had gone. They had taken her husband. The ETA members had left, but first, they had cut the phone intending to leave them without means of communication.

Around 9:30 p.m., some neighbours found Ustaran's vehicle, a white Chrysler 150, at the entrance to the building's garage on San Prucendio street in Vitoria beneath the headquarters of the UCD. The neighbours located Jose Ignacio's body inside the car on the back seat. He has been shot in the back and head.

No charges were brought for this attack. According to the Ministry of Peace and Coexistence of the Basque Government, the case has been closed unsolved.

The day after the murder, ETA political-military claimed responsibility for this attack. The group called the killing “a response to the crossroads that the UCD party, who held power, has created for the Basque's democracy due to the approval of the Status a year ago." The group also stated that the attack had taken places against " the repressive escalation that UCD has launched on Euskadi."

The identity of the perpetrators of the crime remained unknown. In June 2018, the National Audience restated the 1983 decision that they were not able to identify the three gunmen who had pulled him out of his house and killed him.

== Bibliography ==
- MERINO, A., CHAPA, A., Raíces de Libertad. pp. 57–63. FPEV (2011). ISBN 978-84-615-0648-4 (in spanish)
- ANGULO ALTUBE, GORKA., La persecución de ETA a la derecha vasca. pp. 238–247. Editorial Almuzara (2018). ISBN 978-84-17418-25-0
