= Nacho =

Nachos are a Mexican snack food named after its inventor Nacho Anaya.

Nacho may also refer to:

== Name ==
- Nacho (given name), a form of the Spanish masculine name Ignacio (including a list of people with the name or nickname)
- Nacho (footballer, born 1955), Spanish footballer José Ignacio Pérez Frías
- Nacho (footballer, born 1967), Spanish footballer José Ignacio Fernández Palacios
- Nacho (footballer, born 1980), Spanish footballer Ignacio Pérez Santamaría
- Nacho (footballer, born 1989), Spanish footballer José Ignacio Martínez García
- Nacho (footballer, born 1990), Spanish footballer José Ignacio Fernández Iglesias
- Nacho (footballer, born 1993), Spanish footballer Ignacio Agustín Sánchez Romo
- Nacho (singer) (born 1983), Venezuelan singer Miguel Ignacio Mendoza Donatti
- Nacho Anaya, the inventor of the nachos dish

== Film and television ==
- Nacho (1983 TV series), a Venezuelan television show
- Nacho (2023 TV series), a Spanish TV series
- "Nacho" (Better Call Saul episode), an episode of Better Call Saul
- Nacho Varga, a fictional character in Better Call Saul
- Nacho, the main character in the 2006 film Nacho Libre, played by Jack Black
- Nacho Reyes, a fictional character in Carlito's Way: Rise to Power, played by Luis Guzmán

== Other uses ==
- North American Conference of Homophile Organizations
- Not Another Completely Heuristic Operating System
- Nacho, Arunachal Pradesh, India, a village
- Nacho (Vidhan Sabha constituency), an Indian constituency
- Trisodium citrate, chemical formula Na_{3}C_{6}H_{5}O_{7}

== See also ==
- Nacho cheese, a Doritos flavor
- Nacho cheese, a processed cheese dip
