= HMS Hyacinth (1881) =

Sloop of the Royal Navy

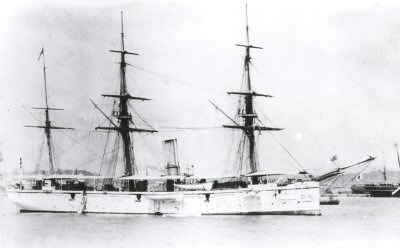
- HMS Hyacinth in typical China station white paint

History

United Kingdom
- Name: HMS Hyacinth
- Builder: Devonport Dockyard
- Cost: Hull – £52,500; Machinery – £14,500
- Laid down: 30 August 1880
- Launched: 20 December 1881
- Commissioned: 27 January 1884
- Fate: Sold for breaking on 25 August 1902

General characteristics
- Class & type: Satellite-class sloop
- Displacement: 1,420 tons
- Length: 200 ft (61 m) pp
- Beam: 38 ft (12 m)
- Draught: 15 ft 9 in (4.80 m)
- Installed power: 1,470 ihp (1,096 kW)
- Propulsion: Single horizontal compound-expansion steam engine; Single screw
- Sail plan: Barque-rigged
- Range: Approximately 6,000 nmi (11,000 km) at 10 kn (19 km/h)
- Complement: 170–200
- Armament: Eight BL 6-inch/100-pounder (81cwt) Mk II guns; One light gun; Four machine guns
- Armour: Internal steel deck over machinery and magazines

HMS Hyacinth was an 8-gun Satellite-class composite sloop built for the Royal Navy, launched in 1881 and sold in 1902. She and the rest of her class were re-classified as corvettes in 1884.

== Design ==
Designed by Nathaniel Barnaby, the Royal Navy Director of Naval Construction, the hull was of composite construction; that is, iron keel, frames, stem and stern posts with wooden planking. This class of composite sloops was unique in having an internal steel deck over the machinery and magazines for protection. Propulsion was provided by a horizontal compound-expansion steam engine of 1,470 indicated horsepower (1,096 kW) driving a single screw. All the ships of the class were built with a barque rig.

Earlier ships of the class had been built with two 6-inch/100-pounder (81cwt) breech-loading guns and ten 5-inch/50-pounder (38cwt) breech-loading guns, but Hyacinth and three of her sisters had eight breech-loading 6-inch/100-pounder (81cwt) Mk II guns instead of the mixed 5-inch and 6-inch armament. This was complemented by a single light gun and four (or more) machine guns.

== Construction ==
Hyacinth was built at Devonport Dockyard, with the keel laid on 30 August 1880. She was launched on 20 December 1881, and the cost of her hull came to £52,500. Machinery provided by Humphreys and Tennant was fitted at a cost of £14,500, and she was commissioned on 27 January 1884.

== Career ==
The Satellite class were reclassified as corvettes in 1884.

Designed for low-level policing duties, Hyacinth, in common with her sister ships Heroine and Caroline, was sent to the China Station.

Between 1886 and 1892 Hyacinth conducted annual cruises in the Pacific, showing the flag and providing protection and reassurance to British citizens of the far-flung maritime Empire. She travelled as far afield as New Zealand, Cook Islands, Samoa, Fiji, New Caledonia, Tahiti and Hawaii.

On 27 September 1888 the Vice-Consul of Rarotonga, Mr R Exham, prompted by rumours of incipient French intervention in the Cook Islands proclaimed a protectorate over the Southern Group, that is, Rarotonga, Mangaia, Aitutaki, Atiu, Mauke, Mitiaro and Takutea. In October and November Captain Edmund Bourke in Hyacinth claimed the islands in the Southern Group for the British Crown; this was later amended to make the Cook Islands a protectorate. On 10 Apr 1889 Hyacinth re-commissioned at Hong Kong.

== Fate ==
It was announced in March 1902 that Hyacinth would be sold out of service owing to defects in her machinery. She was sold to King of Bristol for breaking on 25 August 1902.
