= Punta José Ignacio Lighthouse =

Lighthouse in Uruguay

Punta José Ignacio Lighthouse Faro de José Ignacio
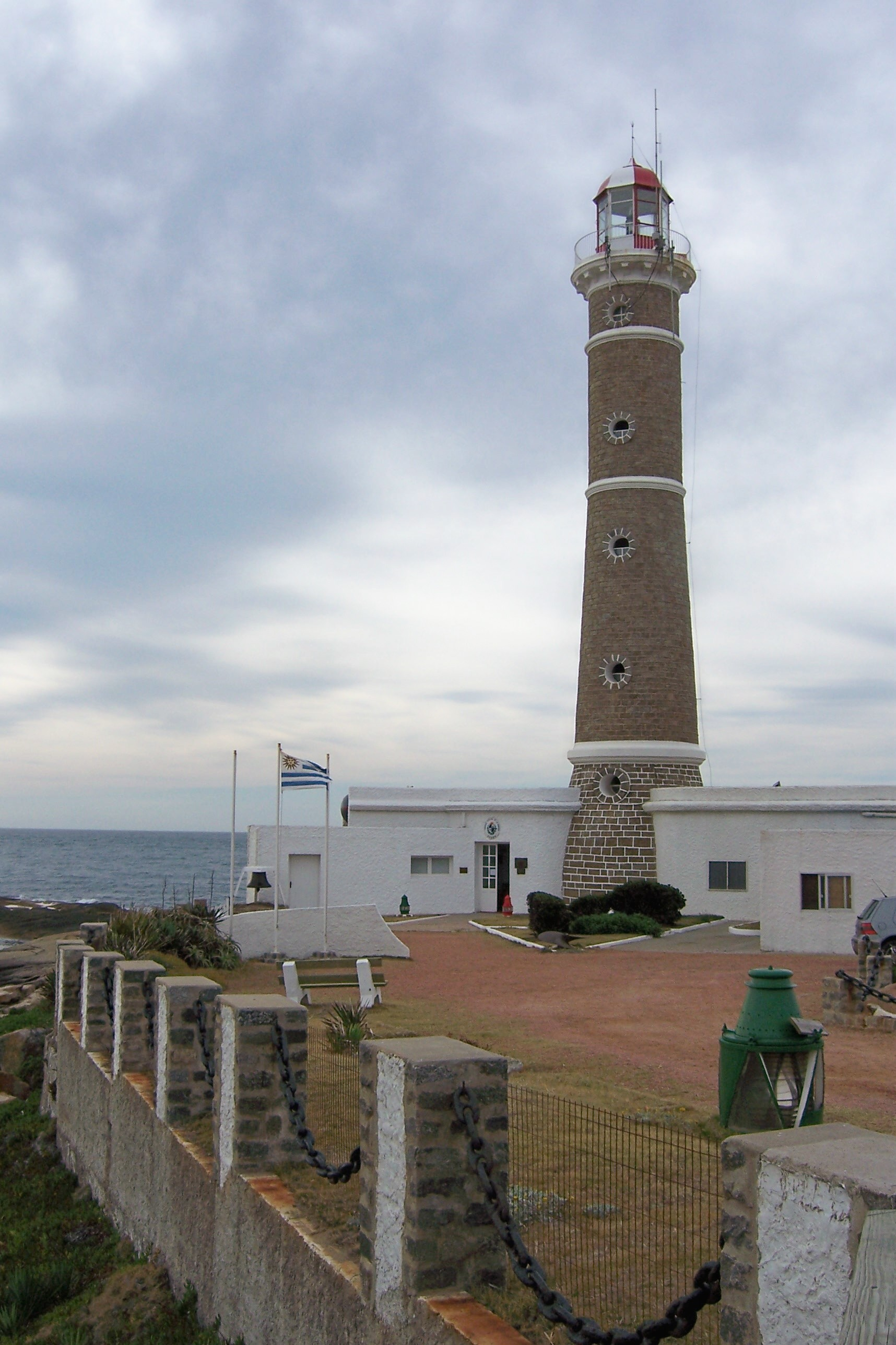
- Punta José Ignacio lighthouse in 2006.
- Location: José Ignacio; Maldonado Department; Uruguay
- Coordinates: 34°50′45.9″S 54°37′58.8″W

Tower
- Constructed: 1877
- Automated: 1983
- Height: 25 metres (82 ft)
- Operator: National Navy of Uruguay

Light
- Focal height: 32.5 metres (107 ft)

José Ignacio Lighthouse or Punta José Ignacio Lighthouse (Spanish: Faro de José Ignacio or Faro de Punta José Ignacio) is a lighthouse located in the headland of José Ignacio, Maldonado Department, Uruguay, overlooking the Atlantic Ocean. It was erected in 1877.

== See also ==
- List of lighthouses in Uruguay
