= USS Selinur =

Cargo ship of the United States Navy

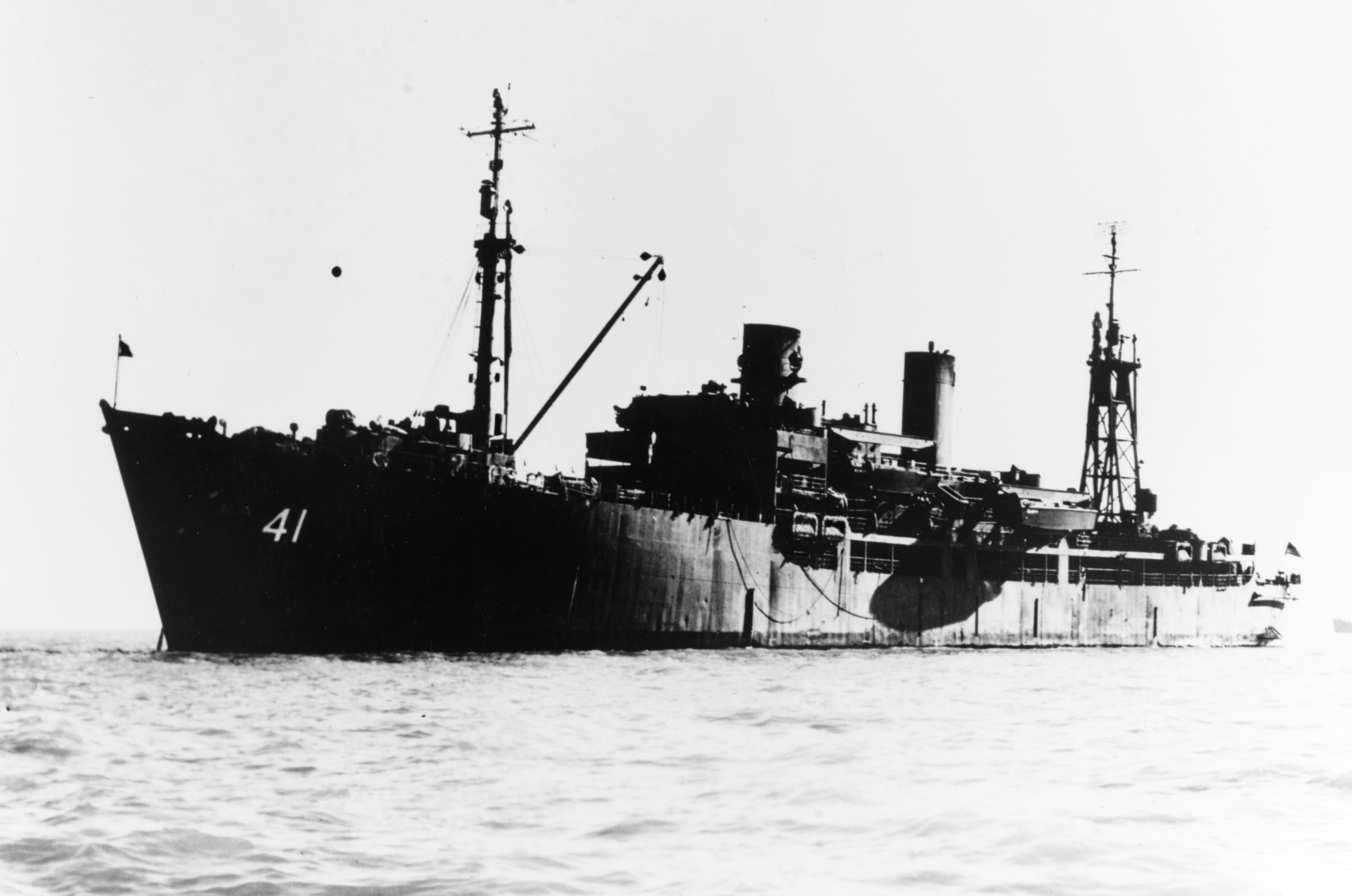

History

United States
- Name: USS Selinur
- Namesake: The asteroid Selinur
- Builder: Walsh-Kaiser Company, Providence, Rhode Island
- Laid down: 18 January 1945
- Launched: 28 March 1945
- Commissioned: 21 April 1945
- Decommissioned: 30 April 1946
- Stricken: 8 May 1946
- Fate: Sold for scrapping, 15 July 1968

General characteristics
- Class & type: Artemis-class attack cargo ship
- Type: S4–SE2–BE1
- Displacement: 4,087 long tons (4,153 t) light; 7,080 long tons (7,194 t) full
- Length: 426 ft (130 m)
- Beam: 58 ft (18 m)
- Draft: 16 ft (4.9 m)
- Speed: 16.9 knots (31.3 km/h; 19.4 mph)
- Complement: 303 officers and enlisted
- Armament: 1 × 5"/38 caliber gun mount; 4 × twin 40 mm gun mounts; 10 × 20 mm gun mounts

USS Selinur (AKA-41) was an Artemis-class attack cargo ship in service with the United States Navy from 1945 to 1946. She was scrapped in 1968.

== History ==
Selinur (AKA-41) was named after the minor planet 500 Selinur, which in turn was named for a character in Friedrich Theodor Vischer's 1879 novel Auch Einer. The ship was laid down on 18 January 1945 under Maritime Commission contract (MC hull 1902) by the Walsh-Kaiser Co., Inc., Providence, R.I.; launched on 28 March 1945; sponsored by Mrs. Wilton Carter; and commissioned on 21 April 1945.

After shakedown, Selinur departed Norfolk, Va., on 27 May 1945 with cargo and personnel for Hawaii, arriving at Honolulu on 18 June. After making cargo voyages to Midway, Hilo, Majuro, and Kwajalein, Selinur sailed from Pearl Harbor on 1 September with occupation troops for Japan and arrived at Sasebo on 22 September. She next sailed for Manila, whence she returned to Sasebo and reported for "Magic Carpet" duty on 20 October. The cargo vessel made two voyages bringing troops home, one from Sasebo and Okinawa and the other from Tacloban, P.I., before being released from "Magic Carpet" duty at San Francisco on 24 January 1946. She arrived at Philadelphia on 16 April for inactivation.

=== Decommissioning and fate ===
Selinur was decommissioned on 30 April, transferred to the Maritime Commission and simultaneously loaned to the Pennsylvania Nautical School as Keystone State. She was struck from the Navy list on 8 May 1946. The ship was returned to the Maritime Commission in 1947 and laid up in the James River as a unit of the National Defense Reserve Fleet. She was sold by the Maritime Administration on 15 July 1968 to the Northern Metals Co., Philadelphia, for scrapping.
