= William McCoy (rum runner) =

American bootlegger and captain

Bill McCoy
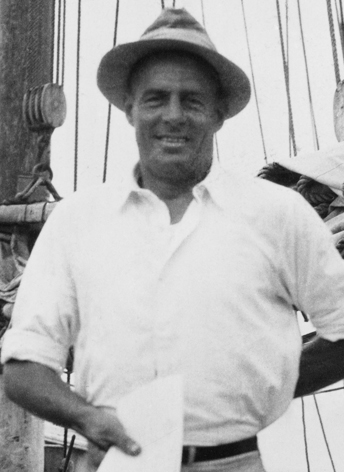
- McCoy in 1921.
- Born: William Frederick McCoy; August 17, 1877; Syracuse, New York, U.S.
- Died: December 30, 1948 (aged 71); Stuart, Florida, U.S.
- Education: Pennsylvania Nautical School
- Occupations: Bootlegger, carpenter, businessman
- Years active: 1919–1923
- Known for: Prominent bootlegger
- Status: Defunct
- Conviction: Violation of the Volstead Act
- Penalty: 9 months

William Frederick "Bill" McCoy (August 17, 1877 – December 30, 1948), was an American sea captain and rum-runner during the Prohibition in the United States. In pursuing the trade of smuggling alcohol from the Bahamas to the Eastern Seaboard, Capt. McCoy, found a role model in John Hancock of pre-revolutionary Boston and considered himself an "honest lawbreaker." McCoy took pride in the fact that he never paid a cent to organized crime, politicians, or law enforcement for protection. Unlike many operations that illegally produced and smuggled alcohol for consumption during Prohibition, McCoy sold his merchandise unadulterated, uncut and clean, for which he became known as "The Real McCoy".

== Biography ==
McCoy was born in Syracuse, New York in 1877 to a Scottish-American family. He had a brother Ben, five years older, and a sister Violet, five years younger. His father, also William McCoy, was a brick mason who had been in the Union Navy during the American Civil War, serving on the blockade of Southern coasts. Bill McCoy attended the Pennsylvania Nautical School on board the then USS Saratoga in Philadelphia, graduating in 1895 first in his class. He later served as mate and quartermaster on various vessels including the P & O steamer Olivette, which was in Havana, Cuba when the USS Maine exploded in 1898.

Around 1900, the McCoy family moved to a small Florida town named Holly Hill, just north of Daytona Beach. Bill and his brother Ben operated a motor boat service and a boat yard in Holly Hill and Jacksonville. By 1918, having constructed vessels for millionaire customers that included Andrew Carnegie and the Vanderbilts among others, McCoy earned a reputation for being a skilled yacht builder.

== McCoy during Prohibition ==
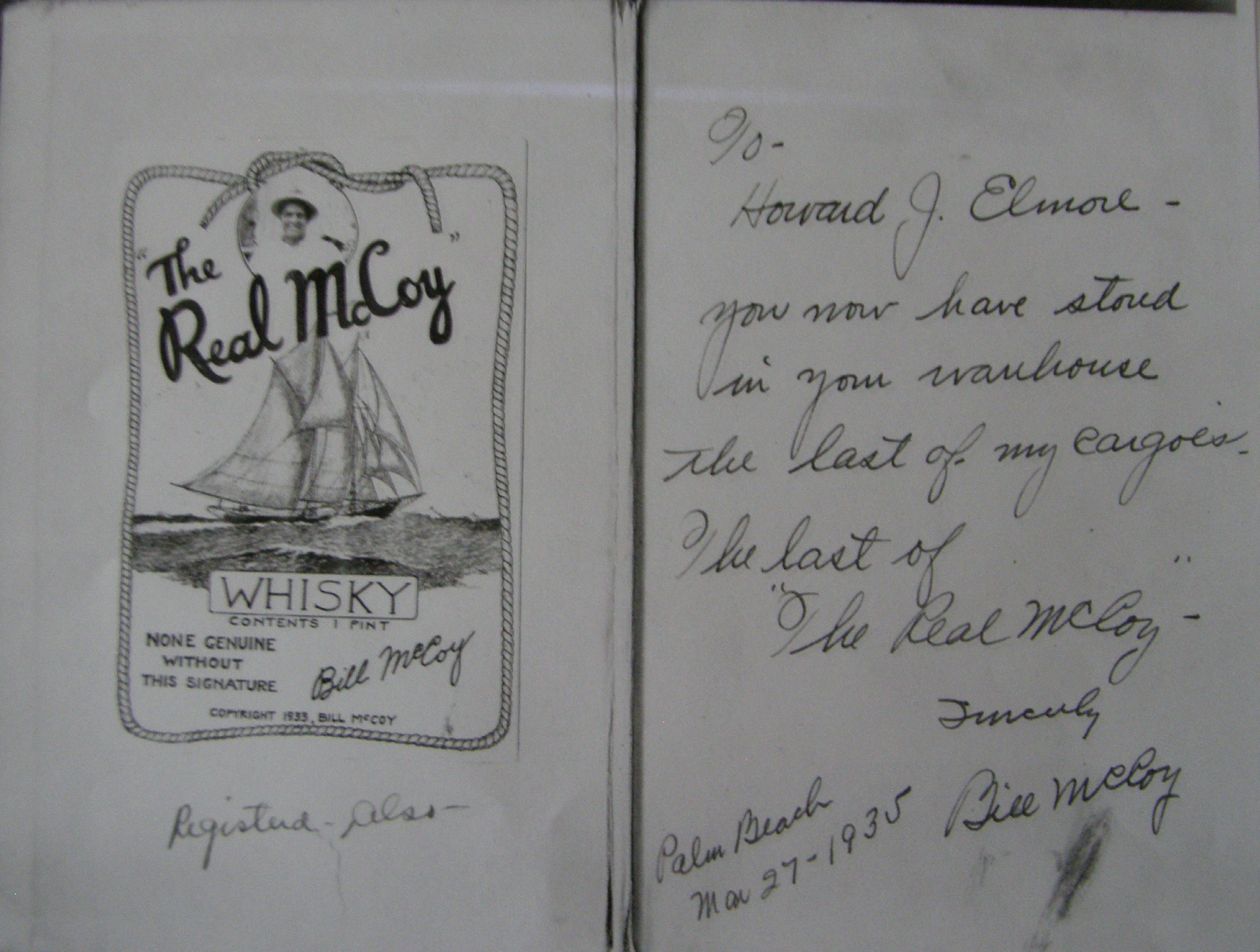
This label (left) is pasted on the inside cover of the book The Real McCoy.

During Prohibition (1920–33), the McCoy brothers fell on hard times. Their excursion and freight business could not compete with the new highways and buses being built up and down the coast and across Florida. Needing money, the two brothers made a decision to go into rum-running. They sold the assets of their business, traveled to Gloucester, Massachusetts, and bought the schooner Henry L. Marshall.

McCoy then began to smuggle whisky, rum and other spirits into the U.S., traveling from Nassau and Bimini in the Bahamas to the east coast of the United States, spending most time dealing on "Rum Row" off New Jersey. After a few successful trips smuggling liquor off the coast of the United States, Bill McCoy had enough money to buy the schooner Arethusa. Placing the schooner under British registry to avoid being US jurisdiction, Bill renamed the vessel Tomoka (after the river that runs through his hometown Holly Hill).

McCoy made a number of successful trips aboard the Tomoka, and – along with the Henry L. Marshall and up to five other vessels – became a household name through his smuggling activities. Capt. McCoy mostly hauled Rye, Irish and Canadian whisky as well as other fine liquors and wines. He is credited with inventing the "burlock" – a package holding six bottles jacketed in straw, three on the bottom, then two, then one, the whole sewn tightly in burlap. It was compact and easy to handle and stow. These were generally known in the Coast Guard as "sacks."

McCoy became a main target of U.S. Assistant Attorney General, Mabel Walker Willebrandt, and organized crime. When the Coast Guard discovered McCoy, he established the system of anchoring large ships off the coast in international waters and selling liquor to smaller ships that transferred it to the shore. McCoy also smuggled liquor and spirits from the French islands of Saint-Pierre and Miquelon located south of Newfoundland.

McCoy Scrapbook images

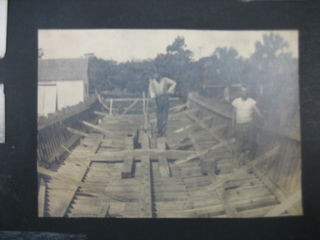
McCoy scrapbook image McCoy Family Papers Collection. J. Henderson Welles Archives and Library, Independence Seaport Museum

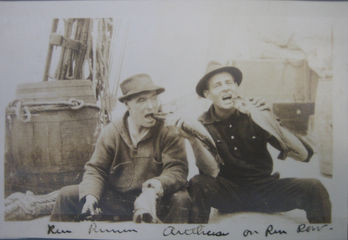
Rum runners aboard Arithusa. McCoy Family Papers Collection. J. Henderson Welles Archives and Library, Independence Seaport Museum

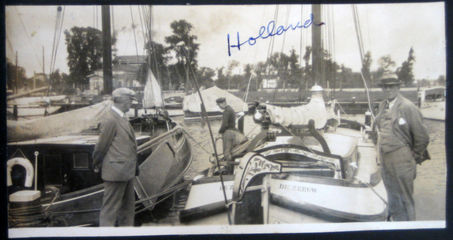
McCoy family in Holland. McCoy scrapbook image McCoy Family Papers Collection. J. Henderson Welles Archives and Library, Independence Seaport Museum

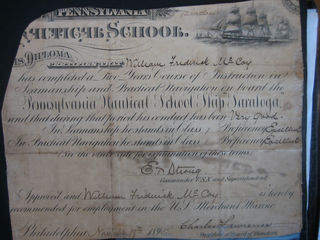
Bill McCoy's Pennsylvania Nautical School Diploma. 1895. McCoy scrapbook image McCoy Family Papers Collection. J. Henderson Welles Archives and Library, Independence Seaport Museum

=== Capture and arraignment ===
On November 23, 1923, the U.S. Coast Guard Cutter Seneca, had orders to capture Bill McCoy and the Tomoka, even if in international waters. The New York Times article that reported on the capture and arraignment of McCoy described the incident:

The report to Collector Elting showed that the Tomaka was first boarded by Lieut. Commander Perkins of the Coast Guard cutter Seneca, who ordered the crew keep silent. The bow of the schooner then was turned out to sea, and when the commander of the cutter observed the movement, he sent a shot across the bow of the Tomaka. She returned the fire with a machine gun set up on her forward deck. The machine gunners ran to cover when the shells of the Seneca began to fall so close to their mark that they kicked the spray over the Tomaka's deck.

McCoy described the chase that led to his capture:

When the Tomoka was boarded under cover of the Seneca's guns, I immediately set sail and ran away with the boarding party – one lieutenant, one bos'n and thirteen seamen – and only upon their pleas did I heave to and put them back on the Seneca. The damned radio was too severe a handicap for me. I surrendered after the Seneca had fired four-inch shells at me.

When asked what defense he planned to make at the hearing before the trial, McCoy introduced the details of his operations by replying:

I have no tale of woe to tell you. I was outside the three-mile limit, selling whisky, and good whisky, to anyone and everyone who wanted to buy.

Instead of a long drawn out trial, Bill McCoy pleaded guilty and spent nine months in a New Jersey jail. He returned to Florida and invested his money in real estate. He and his brother continued the boat-building business and frequently traveled up and down the coast.

== In popular culture ==
In the HBO series Boardwalk Empire, Pearce Bunting portrayed Bill McCoy in nine episodes during the 2010-2013 run of the series.
