= USS Rudderow =

Rudderow-class destroyer escort

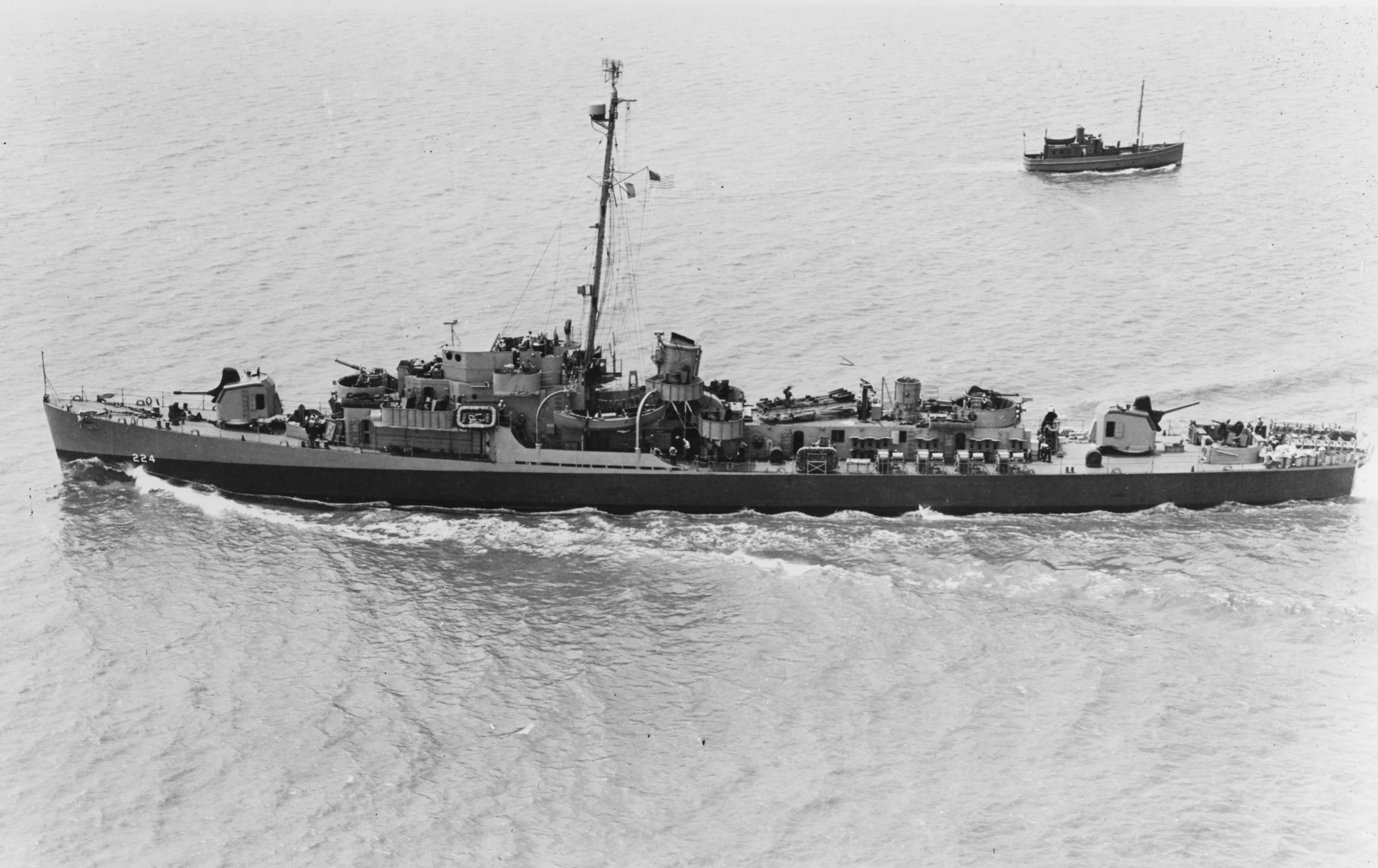

History

United States
- Name: USS Rudderow
- Namesake: Thomas Wright Rudderow
- Builder: Philadelphia Navy Yard, Philadelphia, Pennsylvania
- Laid down: 15 July 1943
- Launched: 14 October 1943
- Commissioned: 14 May 1944
- Decommissioned: 15 January 1947
- Stricken: 1 November 1969
- Honors and awards: 2 battle stars (World War II)
- Fate: Sold for scrap, October 1970

General characteristics
- Class & type: Rudderow-class destroyer escort
- Displacement: 1,450 long tons (1,473 t) light; 1,673 long tons (1,700 t) standard
- Length: 306 ft (93 m)
- Beam: 37 ft (11 m)
- Draft: 13 ft 9 in (4.19 m)
- Propulsion: Turbo-electric drive engine; 12,000 hp (8.9 MW)
- Speed: 24 knots (44 km/h; 28 mph)
- Complement: 221
- Armament: 2 × single 5"/38 caliber guns; 2 × twin 40 mm guns; 10 × single 20 mm guns; 1 × triple 21 inch (533 mm) torpedo tubes; 1 × Hedgehog anti-submarine mortar; 8 × K-gun depth charge projectors; 2 × depth charge tracks

USS Rudderow (DE-224) was the lead ship of her class of destroyer escorts, in service with the United States Navy from 1944 to 1947. After spending decades in reserve, she was sold for scrap in 1970.

== Namesake ==
Thomas Wright Rudderow was born on 8 August 1885 at Philadelphia, Pennsylvania. He attended the Pennsylvania Nautical School and served as navigator and watch officer in SS Adams and SS Mexico prior to assuming duties as Port Captain, Port of Philadelphia, in 1914. Commissioned Ensign in the Naval Militia of Pennsylvania on 14 July 1916, he was mustered into Federal service on 7 April 1917, and assigned in May to the interned Prinz Eitel Friedrich, later renamed DeKalb. On 1 July 1918, he transferred to the U.S. Naval Reserve Force.

In September, he reported for duty with Destroyer Forces at Queenstown, Ireland. He served on the USS Allen during November 1918; on USS McCall from December 1918 to March 1919; and under Commander, Flotilla B, Destroyer Force, Atlantic, between March and June 1919. Relieved from active duty on 25 June 1919, he remained in the Naval Reserve until transferred to the Honorary Retired List on 1 September 1939.

On 3 January 1942, shortly after World War II broke out, while superintendent and commanding officer of the Pennsylvania Nautical School Ship Seneca, Lieutenant Commander Rudderow was recalled to active duty and assigned to the yacht USS Cythera, another World War I veteran being fitted out for coastal patrol work. Assuming command of Cythera when she commissioned on 3 March, he was killed when his ship was torpedoed by U-402 off the North Carolina coast on 2 May 1942. Only two of Cythera's crew survived. They were picked up by the German submarine, taken to Germany, and interned for the duration of the war.

== History ==
USS Rudderow was laid down on 15 July 1943 at the Philadelphia Navy Yard, launched on 14 October 1943 and commissioned on 15 May 1944.

=== Pacific War ===
She completed her shakedown trials off Bermuda and throughout the summer of 1944 participated in submarine hunter-killer patrols and the escort of convoys along the East Coast of the United States. Departing Staten Island on 14 October 1944, she sailed with her division (CortDiv 74) for the Pacific, passing through the Panama Canal on 23 October and joining the 7th Fleet at Humboldt Bay, New Guinea on 21 November.

After coastal escort duties during December, on 8 January 1945 she set sail for Luzon and on 21 January saw her convoy of landing craft safely into Lingayen Gulf. Between then and 7 February she patrolled the Lingayen anti-submarine screen before escorting landing craft to Subic Bay and steaming back to Lingayen Gulf to cover the retirement of LSTs, LCTs, and a fleet oiler to Leyte. A week later she steamed into the Mindanao Sea to assist the torpedoed destroyer Renshaw (DD-499) and escort her to San Pedro Bay.

On 24 February 1945, she began preparations for Operation Victor IV, the assault and occupation of Zamboanga. Setting sail on 8 March, she arrived off the landing area with echelon V-4-E early on 10 March. As U.S. troops pushed into the Zamboangan peninsula, she patrolled the Tictauran and Great Santa Cruz Islands, retiring on 11 March and returning with a reinforcement convoy from Leyte on 16 March. From 25 to 28 March she escorted a convoy from Puerto Princesa, Palawan to Zamboanga, then sailed north to arrive in Mangarin Bay, Mindoro for anti-submarine patrol duty starting on 30 March.

By mid-April 1945, she was back at Leyte and by the end of the month was once more operating in the Sulu Sea. On 5 May, she departed Tawi Tawi and headed southwest to escort a PT boat drydock and gasoline barge being towed by the ATR-4 to Tarakan, Borneo. Between 8 and 11 May she escorted resupply convoys from Morotai to Borneo and on 12 to 13 May towed a damaged PBM 261 miles to Tawi Tawi. She then returned briefly to the Halmaheras before setting sail for Leyte and much-needed repairs on 19 May.

She returned to sea in June 1945, escorting landing craft to Panay and resupply convoys to Morotai. On 18 June she reported for Philippine Sea Frontier duty and commenced inter-island escorts between Hollandia and Ulithi. From 27 July to 1 August she escorted reinforcements to Okinawa, then returned to the Philippines where she remained to the end of the year.

=== Decommissioning and sale ===
On 3 January 1946, she set sail for the United States. Arriving at San Diego by the end of the month, in March she was designated in reserve and was decommissioned on 15 January 1947. In May 1957 she was transferred to the San Francisco Group, Pacific Reserve Fleet, where she remained until struck from the Navy List on 1 November 1969. She was then sold for scrap the following October.

== Military awards and honors ==
During World War II, the USS Rudderow earned two battle stars.

American Campaign Medal
Asiatic-Pacific Campaign Medal (with two bronze service stars)
World War II Victory Medal
Philippine Liberation Medal
