= Enterprise class =

Enterprise class may refer to:

- Enterprise-class aircraft carrier, a class of United States Navy vessel of which the USS Enterprise (CVN-65) was the only product
- Enterprise-class frigate, the final class of 28-gun sailing frigates of the sixth-rate to be produced for the Royal Navy
- Enterprise-class gunboat, five ships operated by the US Navy in the late 19th century
