= 501 Urhixidur =

Main-belt asteroid

Discovery
- Discovered by: Max Wolf
- Discovery site: Heidelberg Observatory
- Discovery date: 18 January 1903

Designations
- Alternative designations: 1903 LB; 1943 FC; 1949 FW; 1951 RB_{2}; 1951 SE; 1955 FB
- Minor planet category: Main belt

Orbital characteristics
- Epoch 31 July 2016 (JD 2457600.5)
- Uncertainty parameter 0
- Observation arc: 113.22 yr (41352 d)
- Aphelion: 3.6114 AU (540.26 Gm)
- Perihelion: 2.7270 AU (407.95 Gm)
- Semi-major axis: 3.1692 AU (474.11 Gm)
- Eccentricity: 0.13953
- Orbital period (sidereal): 5.64 yr (2060.7 d)
- Mean anomaly: 201.00°
- Mean motion: 0° 10^{m} 28.92^{s} / day
- Inclination: 20.854°
- Longitude of ascending node: 357.30°
- Argument of perihelion: 355.03°

Physical characteristics
- Mean diameter: 77+5 −2 km (pole solution 1); 82+2 −4 km (pole solution 2)
- Mass: 4.9×10^{17} kg
- Mean density: 2.0 g/cm^{3}
- Synodic rotation period: 13.17203±0.00002 h (pole solution 1); 13.17203±0.00001 h (pole solution 2)
- Pole ecliptic longitude: 49° ± 40° or 262° ± 24°
- Pole ecliptic latitude: 84° ± 12° or 66° ± 11°
- Geometric albedo: 0.051+0.003 −0.008 (pole solution 1); 0.050+0.002 −0.007 (pole solution 2)
- Apparent magnitude: 12.6–15.9
- Absolute magnitude (H): 9.3

501 Urhixidur is a relatively large (ranked 372nd by IRAS) main belt asteroid. It was discovered on 18 January 1903, by astronomer Max Wolf (1863–1932), at the Heidelberg Observatory in southwest Germany. Like 500 Selinur and 502 Sigune, it is named after a character in Friedrich Theodor Vischer's then-bestseller satirical novel Auch Einer.

Its rotational period was reported as 15 hours in 1992, but corrected to 13.174 hours in 2013.
