= Sigune =

Sigune may refer to:

- Sigune, cousin of Parzival in Arthurian legend
- 502 Sigune, minor planet
