= USS Alliance (1875) =

Gunboat of the United States Navy

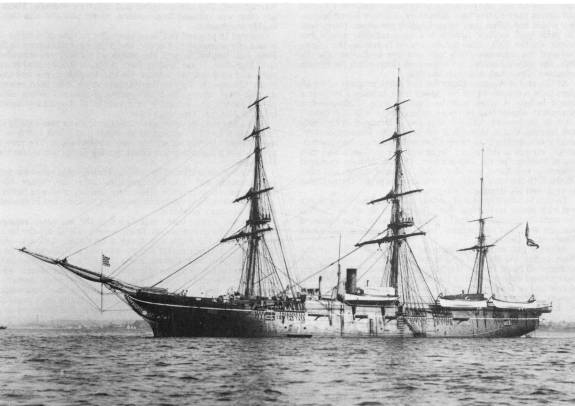
- USS Alliance

History

United States
- Name: Alliance
- Builder: Norfolk Navy Yard
- Launched: 8 March 1875
- Commissioned: 18 January 1877
- Decommissioned: 7 July 1911
- Stricken: 9 August 1911
- Fate: Hulk was "disposed of"

General characteristics
- Type: Enterprise-class gunboat
- Displacement: 1,375 long tons (1,397 t)
- Length: 185 ft (56 m)
- Beam: 35 ft (11 m)
- Draft: 16 ft 4 in (4.98 m)
- Speed: 11 kn (13 mph; 20 km/h)
- Complement: 190
- Armament: 1 × 11 in (280 mm) gun; 4 × 9 in (230 mm) guns; 1 × 60-pounder breech-loading rifle

The second USS Alliance was a screw gunboat that was in service from 1877–1911 with the United States Navy.

Laid down as Huron, a screw gunboat of the third rate, in 1873 at the Norfolk Navy Yard, Alliance was launched on 8 March 1875. She was sponsored by Miss Eulalie Boush, whose father, Naval Constructor George R. Boush, was superintending the warship's construction. However, before Huron joined the fleet, she was renamed Alliance to honor the Revolutionary War frigate. Ultimately, Alliance was commissioned on 18 January 1877 with Commander Theodore F. Kane in command.

== Service history ==
=== 1877–1878 ===
On 25 August 1877, Alliance sailed from Smyrna for Salonika in company with Rear Admiral John L. Worden's flagship, Trenton, and reached that port five days later. She returned to Smyrna, and then again visited Constantinople, where she remained into December. She sailed thence back to Smyrna, the new year 1878 finding her in that port. Having spent eight months in the eastern Mediterranean, Alliance sailed for Villefranche in early January 1878, but returned to Smyrna on 24 February, bringing with her quantities of stores to be distributed among the ships of the squadron.

A few hours after Alliance's arrival, Vandalia arrived at the Piraeus bearing Ulysses S. Grant on his world tour. During ex-President Grant's stay, Alliance rendered honors to him on 13 March. Less than two weeks later, while she lay at the Piraeus, the ship received the King and Queen of Greece, who, after inspecting the flagship, "remained a considerable time on board" Alliance, and departed on 26 March.

Sailing from Havre on 6 August, Alliance reached Cherbourg, France, on the 7th, and remained there for a day, before pushing on for Gibraltar on the 9th. She proceeded thence to Villefranche, arriving there on the 19th. After returning to the eastern Mediterranean, visiting Leghorn, Italy, between 20 and 27 September, she sailed on a cruise "in eastern waters, making Smyrna her headquarters." Alliance later visited Messina, Italy and Volo, Turkey; after "finding affairs there (at Volo) quiet," the gunboat sailed for Smyrna, arriving there on 11 October. Alliance remained there into December.

=== 1878–1904 ===
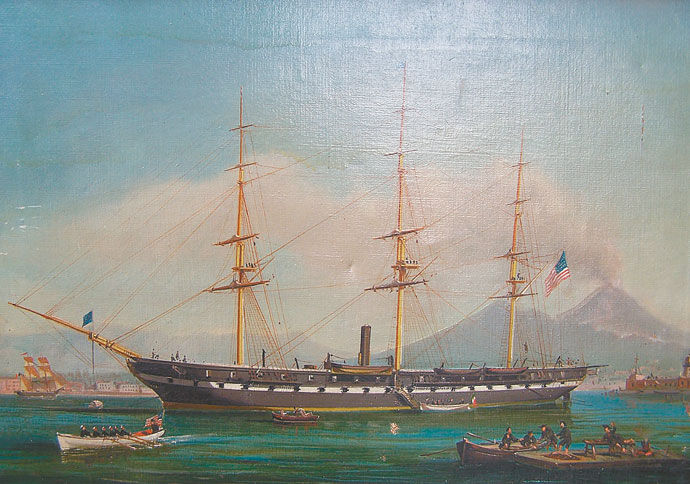
Watercolor of USS Alliance.

In 1879, Alliance carried out much the same routine as in her previous time with the European Squadron, returning to the U.S. late in the year. Reaching Boston on 8 December 1879, Alliance sailed for Norfolk the following day, arriving there on the 14th. For the next five months, the ship lay under repairs at Norfolk, before she received orders at the end of April 1880, to proceed to the Newfoundland Banks, to "search for and establish positions (if found) of the rocks and shoals" reported by shipping in that area. In 1881, Alliance sailed north on an arctic cruise looking for survivors of the Jeannette expedition which had been wrecked that summer near the De Long Islands north of Russia. While in the North Atlantic, she stopped in Iceland and reported on the fate of the Jamestown, which had run aground in June.

After that the ship found herself in the Caribbean monitoring the Colombian civil war in 1885. That year, she captured the one-gun Colombian privateer brigantine Ambrose Light, which was filled with heavily armed sailors and ammunition. Ambrose Light was flying a strange flag, so the Americans assumed the ship to be a pirate. The ship was taken as prize but later released.

Alliance resumed her activities, training landsmen, soon thereafter, attached to the Atlantic Training Squadron. In 1902, the ship visited Queenstown, Ireland; Lisbon, Portugal; Algiers, and Madeira before undergoing voyage repairs at the Norfolk Navy Yard; subsequently, the ship sailed south to Trinidad, St. Kitts, San Juan, and Jamaica, before arriving back in Hampton Roads on 13 June 1903. In 1904, Alliance was among the ships reviewed by President Theodore Roosevelt at Oyster Bay, Long Island, on 17 August 1904.

=== 1904–1911 ===
The ship's last duty commenced soon thereafter, when she was dispatched to Culebra, Puerto Rico, to serve as station ship and store ship at the naval station there. Regarded as "unserviceable for war purposes", she was decommissioned at San Juan on 7 July 1911, and her name was struck from the Naval Vessel Register on 9 August 1911. Her hulk, however, remained in government hands until disposed.
