= Alert-class gunboat =

US Navy gunboats of the late 19th century

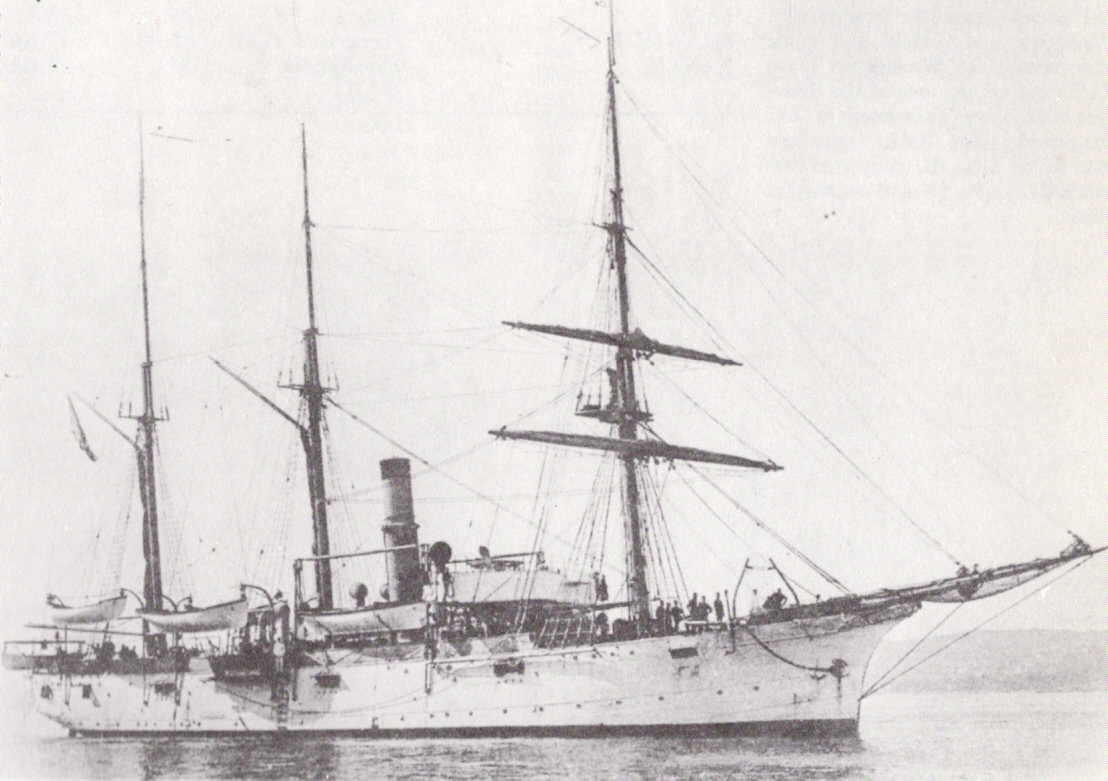
- USS Ranger off Algiers, 1913

Class overview
- Name: Alert class
- Builders: John Roach & Sons; Harlan and Hollingsworth
- Operators: United States Navy
- Built: 1873–1876
- In service: 1875–1940
- Planned: 3
- Completed: 3
- Lost: 1
- Retired: 2

General characteristics
- Type: Screw gunboat
- Displacement: 1,020 long tons (1,040 t)
- Length: loa: 199 feet 9 inches (60.88 m); lbp: 177 feet 4 inches (54.05 m)
- Beam: 32 feet (9.8 m)
- Draft: 12 feet (3.7 m)
- Installed power: 560 ihp (420 kW)
- Propulsion: 5 × boilers; 1 × engine; 1 × propeller
- Sail plan: Varied
- Speed: 10 knots (19 km/h; 12 mph)
- Complement: 202
- Armament: 2 × 9-inch (23 cm) Dahlgren guns; 1 × pivot gun; 1 × muzzle-loading rifle

The Alert-class gunboat was a series of three propeller-driven iron gunboats operated by the US Navy in the late 19th century. The ships were ordered in 1873 when the Navy stalled technologically in the post-Civil War era. All commissioned by 1876, the ships served in various stations throughout the world. The next year, Huron was wrecked in a gale. By 1890, the remaining two ships were removed from distanced service and repurposed for other roles. The last in service, Ranger, was transferred to the Massachusetts Maritime Academy in 1940.

== Development and design ==
Following the end of the American Civil War, the United States Navy had its budget and role reduced by Congress. In the first decade of peace, the only new ships in service were vessels that were laid down during the war. Congress did not fund the Navy as the nation was focused on reconstruction, developing the west, and the effects of the Long Depression. During the decade, the Navy technologically stalled as European fleets continued to modernize and embrace recent developments in armament. This status quo continued until February 1873, when Congress ordered the construction of eight new gunboats for the Navy. Five featured wood hulls and became the Enterprise-class gunboat, while three had iron hulls.

The later trio had a length overall of 199 feet 9 inches (60.88 m), length between perpendiculars of 177 feet 4 inches (54.05 m), a beam of 32 feet (9.8 m), draft of 12 feet (3.7 m), and a displacement of 1,020 long tons (1,040 t), which made the vessels small for the era. Each ship was propelled by 5 boilers that supplied a two-cylinder compound engine that produced 560 indicated horsepower (420 kW) through one propeller. This arrangement allowed speeds up to 10 knots (19 km/h; 12 mph) to be reached, which was considered slow but economical. Armament consisted of an 11-inch (28 cm) pivot gun, a 60-pound (27 kg) muzzle-loading rifle mounted on the forecastle, and a broadside of two 9-inch (23 cm) Dahlgren guns. While Huron and Ranger were fitted with a schooner rig, Alert received a barque rig. The ships' complement consisted of 202 sailors.

== Service history ==
The entire class entered service and were assigned to various stations around the world by 1876. The next year, Huron was wrecked off North Carolina in a severe gale, in an incident that killed 104 crewmembers and destroyed the ship. The accident, in part, was blamed on the iron hull interfering with compass readings. After the disaster, Ranger was rigged as a barque like Alert. By 1890, the remaining two ships were recalled from front-line service. Ranger was used as a survey ship in the Pacific and Alert was converted into a submarine tender in 1911. The latter of the two was sold off in 1922, while Ranger remained in service as a training ship before she was transferred to the Massachusetts Maritime Academy in 1940 and scrapped in 1958.

== Ships in class ==
Data
Name	Builder	Laid down	Launched	Commissioned	Fate
Alert	John Roach & Sons	1873	18 September 1874	27 May 1875	Sold 1922
Huron	John Roach & Sons	1873	2 September 1874	15 November 1875	Wrecked November 1877
Ranger	Harlan and Hollingsworth	1873	10 May 1876	27 November 1876	Stricken 1940
