= Ambrose Light (ship) =

19th-century brigantine operated by Colombian rebels

History
- Name: Ambrose Light
- Builder: Waldoborough, Maine
- Laid down: 1857
- Captured: 1885

General characteristics
- Class & type: brigantine
- Tons burthen: 215
- Armament: one 60 pound cannon

Ambrose Light was a brigantine, operated by Colombian rebels during the Colombian Civil War of 1885. It was captured by the USS Alliance as a suspected pirate vessel in 1885. The accusation of piracy was rejected by a court of law.

== Capture ==
Capture of Ambrose Light
- Part of the Colombian Civil War
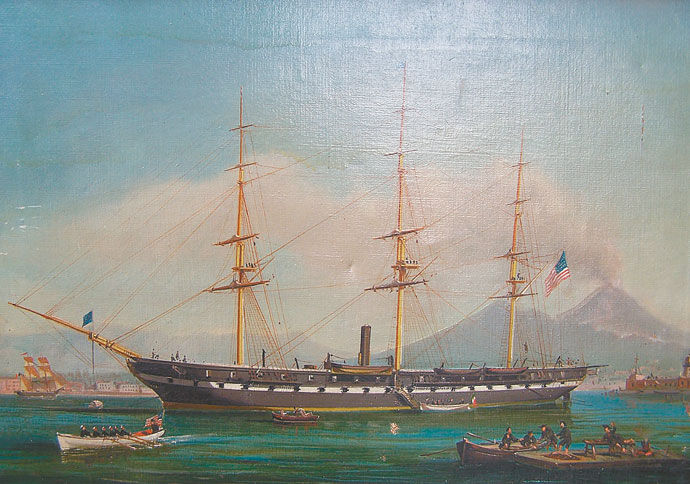
- Watercolor of USS Alliance
Date	April 24, 1885
Location	off Colombia, Caribbean Sea
Result	Ambrose Light and Colombian rebels captured.

Belligerents
United States	Colombian rebels

Commanders and leaders
Lewis Clark	unknown

Strength
1 gunboat	1 brigantine

Casualties and losses
none	60 captured 1 brigantine captured

On April 24, Commander Lewis Clark, of the South Atlantic Squadron, was sailing to Cartagena, on the Caribbean coast of Colombia, when the lookouts aboard the Alliance sighted the one-gun Ambrose Light. It was flying a strange flag featuring a red cross over a white background so the Americans assumed the vessel was a pirate ship. A chase began. The Americans were preparing to fire a shot over the vessel's bow when a Colombian ensign was observed and the Ambrose Light came to a halt. Commander Clark put Lieutenant M. Fisher, and a boarding party, on the rebel ship and it was found to have been armed with one cannon and sixty heavily armed sailors. A large cache of ammunition was also discovered. The Colombians revealed their letter of marque from the rebel leader Pedro Lara, giving the men of Ambrose Light permission to blockade Cartagena. Commander Clark disregarded this and took the rebels prisoner and the brigantine as a prize. The ship was put under the command of Lieutenant Fisher with ten others and sent to be condemned in New York. After arriving on June 1, a stowaway was found, starving to death, hiding behind some casks in the cargo hold. The man immediately received medical attention.

== Legal case ==
Following the court proceedings, it was agreed that Alliance had lawfully seized the rebels as pirates because Pedro Lara, as a rebel, had no right to commission warships.

After the legal decision of the United States District Court in New York, the ship was returned to her Colombian owners, in return for costs. Judge Brown ruled that the ship could legally be used to transport troops between Colombian ports during the Colombian Civil War. When fighting broke out in Cartagena, American Secretary of State Thomas F. Bayard released Ambrose Light and her crew.

This incident was the basis for a decision in case law that defines who can be called a pirate in the United States.

== See also ==
- West Indies Anti-Piracy Operations of the United States
