= USS Adams (1874) =

US Navy vessel

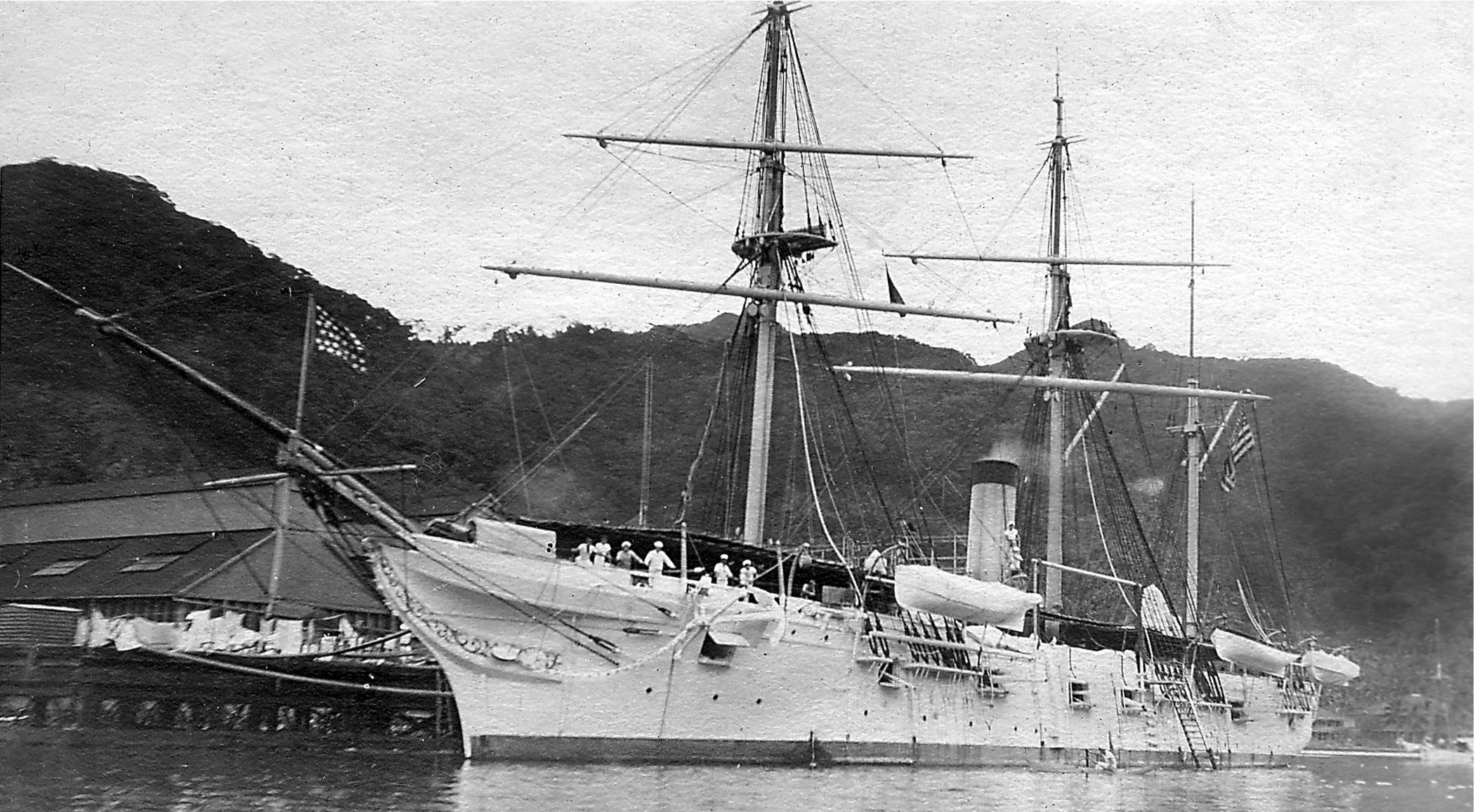
- Adams, c. 1905

History

United States
- Name: USS Adams
- Namesake: John Adams
- Builder: Donald McKay
- Laid down: February 1874
- Launched: 24 October 1874
- Commissioned: 21 July 1876
- Decommissioned: 20 September 1884
- Recommissioned: 2 November 1885
- Decommissioned: 25 March 1889
- Recommissioned: 22 April 1889
- Decommissioned: 31 July 1890
- Recommissioned: 23 March 1892
- Decommissioned: 16 November 1894
- Recommissioned: 24 December 1895
- Decommissioned: 30 April 1898
- Recommissioned: 7 October 1898
- Decommissioned: 31 December 1907
- Fate: Loaned to Pennsylvania Nautical School, 20 August 1908
- Acquired: Returned to U.S. Navy 6 February 1914
- Fate: Loaned to New Jersey naval militia, 1 May 1914
- Acquired: Returned to U.S. Navy 1917
- Recommissioned: 27 August 1917
- Decommissioned: 5 August 1919
- Fate: Sold into mercantile service August 1920; Scrapped 1921 or 1922

General characteristics
- Class & type: Enterprise-class gunboat
- Displacement: 1,375 long tons (1,397 t)
- Length: 185 ft (56 m)
- Beam: 35 ft (11 m)
- Draft: 14 ft 3 in (4.34 m)
- Propulsion: Steam engine, screw
- Sail plan: Barque-rigged
- Speed: 9.8 knots (18.1 km/h; 11.3 mph)
- Complement: 190
- Armament: 1 × 11 in (280 mm) gun; 4 × 9 in (230 mm) guns; 1 × 60-pounder Parrott rifle

USS Adams was a screw gunboat of the Enterprise-class.

== Construction and commissioning ==
Adams was built as a single screw, wooden-hull, bark-rigged steamer. The ship was laid down in February 1874 at Boston, Massachusetts, by Donald McKay; and was launched on 24 October 1874. The new ship was commissioned on 21 July 1876 at the Boston Navy Yard, Comdr. John W. Philip in command.

== Service history ==
=== North and South Atlantic, 1876–1878 ===
Though initially assigned to the North Atlantic Station, Adams appears to have had no real mission on that station. She spent most of her time in a succession of ports getting ready for permanent assignment. She departed Boston on 6 August, visited Philadelphia between 9 August and 3 September, and then returned to sea, bound for the Norfolk-Hampton Roads area. The warship tarried there from 6 September to 17 November at which time she got underway for Port Royal, South Carolina. She arrived in Port Royal on 20 November and spent the winter of 1876 and 1877 there. On 9 March 1877, Adams headed back to Norfolk. She arrived there on the 12th and remained about five weeks.

On 21 April, the warship put to sea for duty on the South Atlantic Station. If her mission on the North Atlantic Station could be regarded as preparatory, her South Atlantic Station assignment might be called transitory. She arrived at Rio de Janeiro, Brazil, on 2 June. Over the next three months, Adams operated along the Brazilian coast, performing one search mission in June and a survey operation in July. On 8 September, she stood out of Rio de Janeiro and headed south toward the Strait of Magellan. Along the way, the warship called at Montevideo and Buenos Aires. She arrived at the Strait of Magellan on 12 November and remained in the vicinity almost a month to be available to provide assistance to Chilean government officials at Sandy Point during a mutinous situation there. Adams resumed her voyage on 8 December and entered port at Valparaíso, Chile, on the 14th.

=== Pacific Squadron, 1878–1882 ===
On the first day of 1878, the warship stood out of Valparaíso bound for Callao and to begin cruising on the Pacific Station. She stopped at Callao from 11 January to 5 February and reached Panama City on 21 February. Adams remained at Panama for three months. On 10 May, the ship embarked the Samoan plenipotentiary, la Mamea, who had just completed negotiations in Washington on a treaty of amity and commerce between the United States and his island kingdom, and she set sail to return him and his delegation to Samoa. Adams arrived in Apia harbor on 28 June and stayed for a month to participate in the requisite ceremonies and celebrations. Between 29 and 30 July, she made the transit from Apia to Pago Pago, the harbor the rights to which the United States had acquired as a result of the recent treaty. Adams returned to Apia for two weeks from 7 to 20 August and then got underway to return to the west coast of South America.

The warship arrived at Valparaíso, Chile, on 15 October and remained there until late November. On 21 November, Adams stood out of Valparaíso bound for Callao, Peru, where she arrived on 2 December for a two-month sojourn. She returned to sea on 5 February 1879 to voyage to Panama, reaching her destination on 14 February. After nearly three months at Panama, Adams headed back to Callao on 11 May and entered that port on the 20th. A week later, on the 27th, she stood out to sea and laid in a course to Panama on the first leg of a leisurely voyage up the coast via Punta Arenas in Costa Rica, La Unión, El Salvador, and Acapulco and Mazatlán in Mexico. On 19 July, the warship arrived in San Francisco and, two days later, began a lengthy period of repairs at the Mare Island Navy Yard.

Adams concluded her long stay at Mare Island on 3 February 1880. She made the short trip back to San Francisco that same day and began preparations to return to duty on the Pacific Station. The warship put to sea again on 21 February and headed south. Voyaging by way of Pichilinque Bay and Mazatlan in Mexico, Adams arrived at the Gulf of Dulce in Costa Rica on 29 February and set about establishing a coaling point for ships serving on the Pacific Station. After completing that mission, the warship cruised on station between Costa Rica and Peru until the summer of 1881. On 11 June 1881, she departed Punta Arenas, Costa Rica, to return to San Francisco. She reached her destination on 12 July and entered the Mare Island Navy Yard on the 28th.

Adams left the yard on 23 August and returned to San Francisco for two days before heading back to the west coast of Latin America on the 25th. She arrived at Panama (then a part of the United States of Colombia) on 15 September to begin another seven months cruising along the Central American coast. On 11 April 1882, she concluded her assignment on the coasts of South and Central America by departing Panama and setting a course for California. The warship made stops in Mexico at Acapulco and Pichilinque Bay before reentering San Francisco Bay on 11 May. Two days later, she made the short trip to the Mare Island Navy Yard for a month of repairs.

=== Alaska, 1882–1884 ===
Back at San Francisco on 11 September, Adams stood out to sea the following day. Instead of heading south to the coasts of Latin America, however, she pointed her bow north and made for Alaskan waters. The warship reached Sitka on 1 October and began a tour of duty in the northern Pacific of almost 23 months in duration. Her two main functions in Alaska seem to have been monitoring the seal fur industry and regulating the relations between the native Indian and Eskimo population and the multitude of white traders, trappers, prospectors, sealers, and whalers that had established themselves in the area since the United States purchased the territory from Russia in 1867.

Adams had not been on station a month before her commanding officer had to intervene in two incidents involving representatives of the Northwest Trading Company and the native population. Both cases involved the accidental death of an Indian while performing work for the company. In the first instance Comdr. Merriman, backed by Adams and her guns, simply informed the Indians that their custom of levying reparations in the event of an accidental death did not apply in relations with white men and warned them that attempts to do so would bring swift reprisal. That tribe submitted with ill-concealed malevolence.

The second instance, however, required a more emphatic response. When an Indian shaman died as the result of an accidental explosion during a whaling operation on 22 October, the natives of the village of Angoon seized two white men and two of the three company vessels involved and demanded a payment of 200 blankets. The superintendent quickly put to sea in the company's steam tug Favorite and made the voyage to Sitka. There, Comdr. Merriman armed Favorite with a howitzer and a Gatling gun and mounted an expedition comprising Favorite and Adams' launch reinforced with 50 sailors and 20 marines from Adams and soon augmented by the revenue cutter Thomas Corwin, commanded by Michael Healy.

Upon arrival at Angoon, the force collected as many of the Indians' canoes as possible, and Comdr. Merriman held a meeting with some of the Indians during which he made counter demands for the release of the hostages and a levy of 400 blankets in return for which the expedition would spare their canoes and village. To buy time, the Indians accepted the demands at first and released the hostages; however, after they had an opportunity to hide their canoes and gather their forces, the Indians refused to honor the agreement. Thereupon, Corwin and Favorite took the village under fire, destroying a number of houses. When the ships ceased fire, a landing party went ashore and set fire to some of the remaining houses. At that point the Indians submitted. Comdr. Merriman left a party of sailors at Angoon to insure continued good faith, and he and the remainder returned to Sitka in Corwin to reembark in Adams.

Adams patrolled Alaskan waters from her base at Sitka until late in the summer of 1884. On 19 August 1884, the warship departed Sitka and headed south along the coast of North America. She arrived in San Francisco on the 27th and moved to the Mare Island Navy Yard the following day. On 20 September 1884, Adams was placed out of commission at Mare Island.

=== South America, Hawaii and Samoa, 1885–1890 ===
She remained inactive for a little more than a year. On 2 November 1885, she was recommissioned at Mare Island, Comdr. Louis Kempff in command. Adams spent the ensuing month preparing for an extended tour of duty on the coasts of Central and South America.

She stood out of San Francisco on 2 December and, after several stops at Mexican ports along the way, arrived at San José de Guatemala on 4 January 1886. For 16 months, Adams "showed the flag" along the western coast of Latin America between Guaymas, Mexico, in the north and Coquimbo, Chile, in the south. On 15 May 1887, the warship left Acapulco, Mexico, and set a course for the Hawaiian Islands. She arrived in Honolulu on 14 June.

As tantalizing as it might be to speculate on the relationship between her arrival in Honolulu and the "Bloodless Revolution of 1887" carried out during her extended stay in Honolulu, neither she nor her sailors participated in the events ashore. Her presence, however, probably fostered an air of sanguinity in the minds of those Americans who carried out reforms in the government of the native monarch. The political situation ashore did prompt the extension of her visit until almost three weeks after the elections held on 12 September. Adams steamed out of Honolulu on 2 October.

Leaving one Polynesian paradise in her wake, the warship set course for another – Samoa. She entered the harbor at Apia on the island of Upolu on 19 October. Her sojourn in the Samoan Islands came as a result of increased German influence in the islands and lasted almost without interruption – she made a round-trip voyage to Tonga in November 1887 – until the beginning of 1888. During her stay, Adams also visited Tutuila and Pago Pago, but returned periodically to Apia. On 1 February 1888, the warship departed Pago Pago and set sail for Hawaii. She arrived in Honolulu on 27 February and remained there until mid-May. On 14 May, Adams put to sea to return to Samoa where she arrived at the end of the month. The warship spent the summer months of 1888 cruising among the major islands that make up the Samoan group, leaving the vicinity only once, in late July, for another visit to Tonga. On 15 September, Adams entered port at Apia and remained there until near the end of the first week in December.

On 6 December, she set sail for the United States. The warship made a stop of nearly two weeks duration at Honolulu early in January 1889 before resuming her voyage to the California coast. Adams reached San Francisco on 30 January. On 1 February, she moved to the Mare Island Navy Yard where she was placed out of commission briefly for repairs between 25 March and 22 April 1889. Recommissioned on the latter date, Comdr. Edwin T. Woodward in command, Adams took on stores and supplies before departing San Francisco on 18 June. She arrived at Honolulu on Independence Day 1889 and remained there for a month.

The duration of her stay in Hawaii resulted from the maturation of a plot to dethrone King Kalākaua and dissolve the reform government installed by American business and missionary interests as a result of the "Bloodless Revolution of 1887" that had been carried out in the course of Adams' previous extended sojourn in the islands. During the night of 29 and 30 July, insurgents occupied the palace grounds and a local militia unit, styled the Honolulu Rifles, took up positions in support of the government. By the evening of the 30th, the Honolulu Rifles had subdued the insurrection. At that point, a landing party from Adams went ashore and established itself in the vicinity of the American legation. The Hawaiian government restored order quickly without the necessity of American intervention, so the landing party reembarked in the warship the following morning.

On 4 August 1889, Adams departed Honolulu and shaped a course south to Samoa. The warship arrived at Apia, Samoa, on 20 August. For the next nine months, she remained in those islands serving as American station ship there making periodic visits to various of the islands. On 2 May 1890, Adams set sail from Pago Pago bound via Hawaii for the west coast of the United States. She entered San Francisco Bay on 24 June and moored at the Mare Island Navy Yard on the 25th. There, she was placed out of commission, in ordinary, on 31 July 1890.

=== Alaska and Hawaii, 1892–1894 ===
After almost 20 months of inactivity at Mare Island, Adams was recommissioned on 23 March 1892, Comdr. Thomas Nelson in command. Upon resuming active service, the steam frigate rejoined the forces assigned to the Pacific Station and returned to one of her old haunts – Alaskan waters. She stood out of San Francisco on 12 April 1892 and, after stops in Washington state, arrived at Sitka, Alaska, on 17 May. For more than six months, Adams patrolled the sealing grounds of the northeastern Pacific enforcing regulations on the seal fur industry. On 1 December, the warship departed Unalaska to return to San Francisco for repairs. Arriving at her destination on 17 December, she moved to the Mare Island Navy Yard that same day and then entered drydock on the 20th.

Refloated on 11 January 1893, Adams remained in the San Francisco Bay area until 12 April when she put to sea on her way to the Hawaiian Islands. Her mission, as in the past, was to observe conditions and protect American interests during a period of domestic political unrest. That situation had been brought about by the revolution of January 1893 in which the faction that favored annexation by the United States overthrew the native Hawaiian monarchy once and forever, replacing the government of Queen Liliuokalani with a republic. Adams arrived in Honolulu on 26 April 1893 and remained there for almost a year.

On 15 April 1894, the warship stood out of Honolulu and shaped a course for the northwestern coast of the United States. She arrived in Port Townsend, Washington, on 1 May. On the 4th, she entered drydock at Quartermaster Harbor, Washington. On the 10th, Adams took departure from Port Townsend and headed back to Alaska. She reached Sitka on 26 May and resumed duty patrolling the sealing grounds on the 29th. That duty lasted until 27 August when she left Sitka, Alaska, to return to California. Adams arrived in San Francisco on 12 September and entered the yard at Mare Island that same day. The warship completed work in the drydock on 8 November only to be placed out of commission eight days later on 16 November 1894.

=== Hawaii and West Coast, 1895–1898 ===
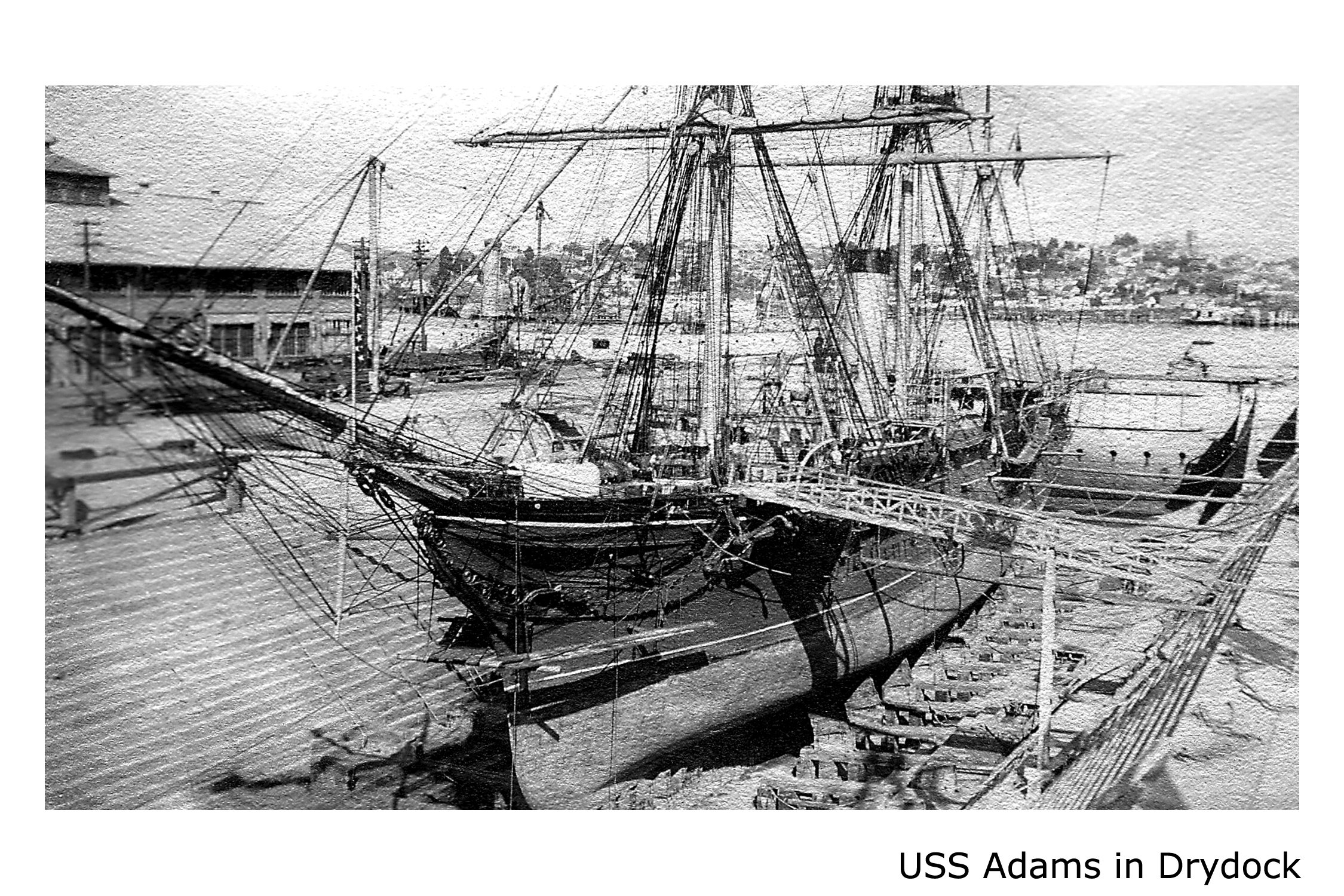
USS Adams in dry dock

After more than 13 months of inactivity at the Mare Island Navy Yard, Adams was placed back in commission there on Christmas Eve 1895, Comdr. Eugene W. Watson in command. Following almost two months of preparations, the warship exited San Francisco Bay on 18 February 1896 on her way to the Hawaiian Islands. She stood into Honolulu on 1 March and began nine months of duty there. Adams left Honolulu on 12 December and arrived at San Francisco on the 28th. After repairs, she returned to sea early in February 1897 to begin duty training recruit apprentices and cruised the waters along the California coast until the latter part of April. On 19 April, she cleared Magdalena Bay, in Lower California (Mexico), and shaped a course for Hawaii. During May, Adams visited Hilo and Honolulu before heading back to the west coast of the United States on 29 May. She arrived at Port Angeles, Washington, on 18 June and spent the summer and fall of 1897 visiting ports on the west coasts of Canada and the United States. On 21 November, Adams stood put of Magdalena Bay on her way to Hawaii again. The warship arrived at Hilo on 14 December. After stops there and at Honolulu, she put to sea to return to California on 6 January 1898. On 30 April 1898, Adams was decommissioned once more. She remained inactive for just over five months.

=== Hawaii and Samoa, 1898–1907 ===
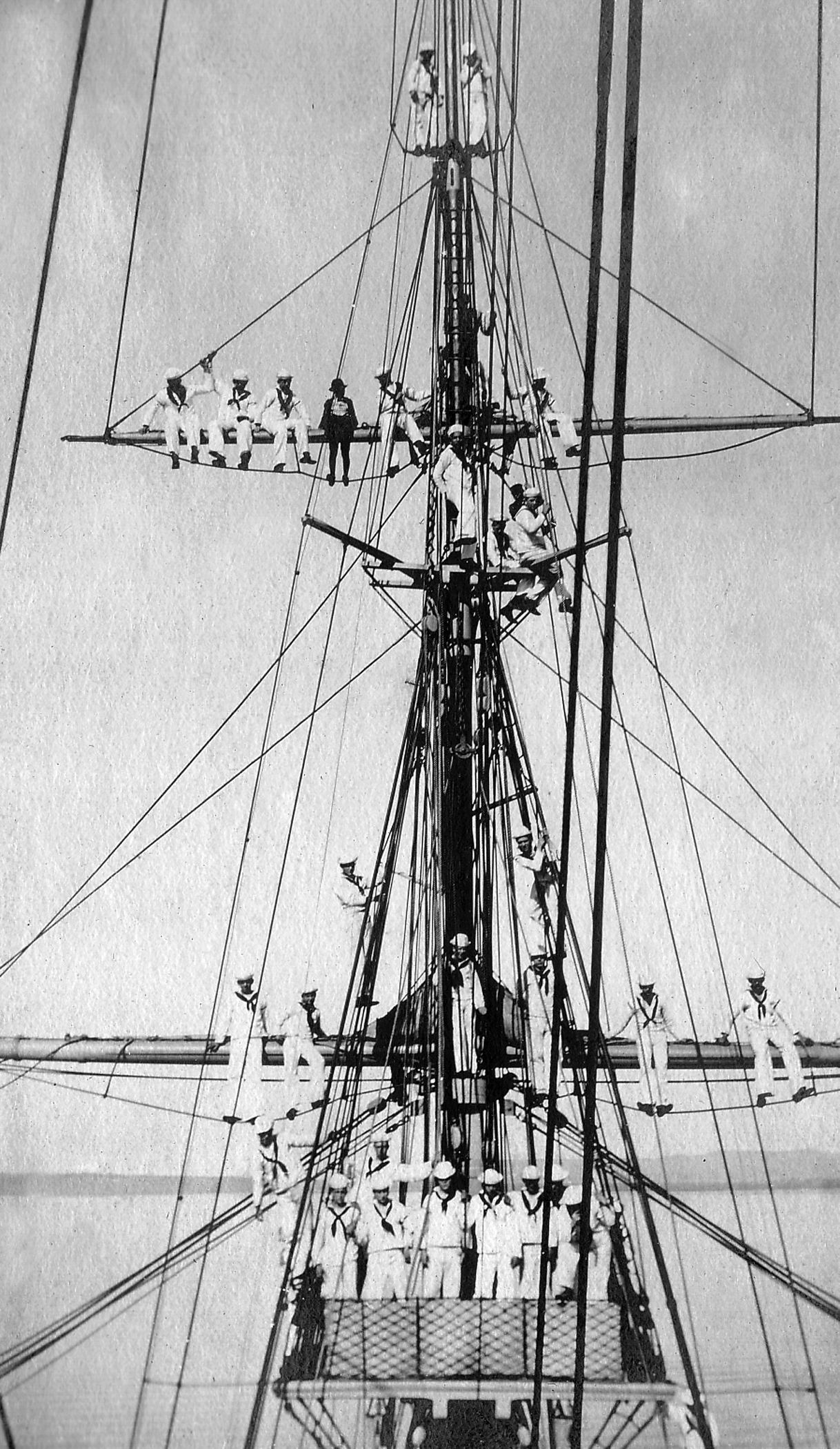
USS Adams crew, c. 1906

On 7 October 1898, the warship was recommissioned, Comdr. George M. Book in command. Adams returned to sea on 24 March 1899 with a full complement of recruits embarked for training. She arrived at Magdalena Bay for the usual month of drills at that location. On 4 May, she stood out of the bay for the portion of the training cruise that took her to Hawaii. Her visit to the islands lasted from 26 May to 19 June and included stops at Hilo, Lahaina, and Honolulu. Adams returned to the west coast of North America on 13 July at Port Angeles, Washington. A week later, she embarked on the Canadian leg of the voyage. Adams entered San Francisco on 26 July.

Apprentice training cruises along the west coast, punctuated by periodic voyages to Hawaii, occupied her time until the beginning of 1904. She returned to San Francisco from her last training cruise on 14 March 1904 and disembarked the apprentices for distribution throughout the fleet. At that point, Adams began fitting out for an extended tour of duty as station ship at Samoa. She stood out of San Francisco Bay on 24 April 1904 and, after sailing by way of Honolulu, entered port at Pago Pago at the beginning of June. Adams remained on station at Samoa for three years. On 17 June 1907, she set sail to return to the United States by way of the Indian Ocean, the Suez Canal, the Mediterranean Sea, and the Atlantic Ocean. On 21 November 1907, while Adams was completing the last leg of her voyage home, the Navy Department decided to loan her to the State of Pennsylvania as a school ship for the Pennsylvania Nautical School. She arrived at League Island, on 19 December 1907; and she was placed out of commission there on 31 December 1907.

=== Training and station ship, 1908–1919 ===
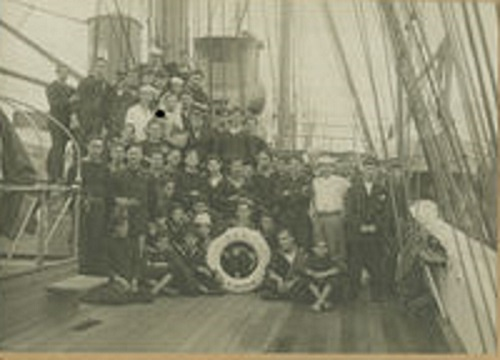
Pennsylvania Nautical School Cadets aboard schoolship Adams. 1909. Pennsylvania Nautical School Collection. J Henderson Welles Archives and Library. Philadelphia, PA.

Turned over to Pennsylvania on 20 August 1908, Adams served as school ship for the Pennsylvania Nautical School in Philadelphia until returned to Navy custody on 6 February 1914. On 1 May 1914, she was loaned to the State of New Jersey to be used in training that state's naval militia. The warship continued to train New Jersey naval militiamen until after the United States entered World War I in April 1917. Recommissioned on 27 August 1917, Adams served as station ship in the Delaware River through the end of the war until decommissioned on 5 August 1919.

== Fate ==
Adams was sold to Joseph N. Tobin of New York City, in August 1920. The former warship operated briefly in mercantile service with a Polish company as Stefan Batory before being broken up in 1921 or 1922.

== Awards ==
- Navy Expeditionary Medal
- Spanish Campaign Medal
- Victory Medal
