= 502 Sigune =

Main-belt asteroid

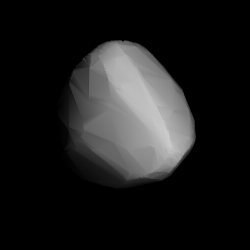
- Modelled shape of Sigune from its lightcurve

Discovery
- Discovered by: Max Wolf
- Discovery site: Heidelberg
- Discovery date: 19 January 1903

Designations
- Pronunciation: German: [ˈziːɡuːnə]
- Alternative designations: 1903 LC

Orbital characteristics
- Epoch 31 July 2016 (JD 2457600.5)
- Uncertainty parameter 0
- Observation arc: 112.94 yr (41251 d)
- Aphelion: 2.8101 AU (420.38 Gm)
- Perihelion: 1.9546 AU (292.40 Gm)
- Semi-major axis: 2.3824 AU (356.40 Gm)
- Eccentricity: 0.17955
- Orbital period (sidereal): 3.68 yr (1343.1 d)
- Mean anomaly: 271.391°
- Mean motion: 0° 16^{m} 4.908^{s} / day
- Inclination: 25.030°
- Longitude of ascending node: 133.001°
- Argument of perihelion: 19.203°
- Earth MOID: 0.975533 AU (145.9377 Gm)
- Jupiter MOID: 2.24872 AU (336.404 Gm)
- T_{Jupiter}: 3.390

Physical characteristics
- Mean radius: 7.99±1 km
- Synodic rotation period: 10.922 h (0.4551 d)
- Geometric albedo: 0.3405±0.105
- Absolute magnitude (H): 10.77

502 Sigune is a minor planet, specifically an asteroid orbiting primarily in the asteroid belt. Like 501 Urhixidur and 500 Selinur, it is named after a character in Friedrich Theodor Vischer's then-bestseller satirical novel Auch Einer.
