= 500 Selinur =

Main-belt asteroid

Discovery
- Discovered by: Max Wolf
- Discovery site: Heidelberg
- Discovery date: 16 January 1903

Designations
- Pronunciation: German: [ˈzeːliːnʊɐ̯]
- Alternative designations: 1903 LA

Orbital characteristics
- Epoch 31 July 2016 (JD 2457600.5)
- Uncertainty parameter 0
- Observation arc: 112.90 yr (41238 d)
- Aphelion: 2.9936 AU (447.84 Gm)
- Perihelion: 2.2313 AU (333.80 Gm)
- Semi-major axis: 2.6124 AU (390.81 Gm)
- Eccentricity: 0.14588
- Orbital period (sidereal): 4.22 yr (1542.3 d)
- Mean anomaly: 43.1528°
- Mean motion: 0° 14^{m} 0.312^{s} / day
- Inclination: 9.7716°
- Longitude of ascending node: 289.934°
- Argument of perihelion: 74.510°

Physical characteristics
- Mean radius: 21.60±0.55 km
- Synodic rotation period: 8.0111 h (0.33380 d)
- Geometric albedo: 0.1804±0.009
- Absolute magnitude (H): 9.2

500 Selinur is a minor planet, specifically an asteroid orbiting in the asteroid belt. Like 501 Urhixidur and 502 Sigune, it is named after a character in Friedrich Theodor Vischer's then-bestseller satirical novel Auch Einer.
