= Enterprise-class gunboat =

Late 19th century US Navy gunboats

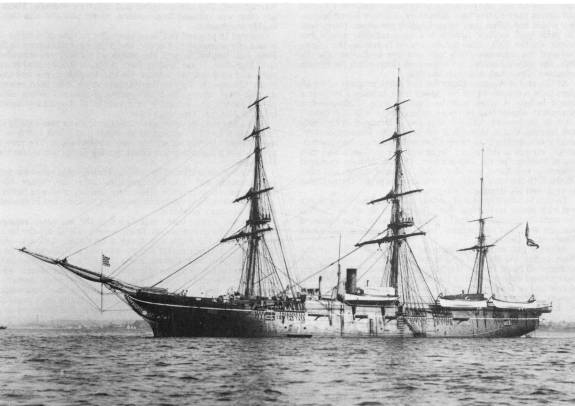
- USS Alliance off Staten Island c. 1900

Class overview
- Name: Enterprise class
- Builders: Boston Navy Yard; Norfolk Navy Yard; Portsmouth Navy Yard; Washington Navy Yard
- Operators: United States Navy
- Preceded by: Kansas class
- Succeeded by: Alert class
- Built: 1873–1879
- In service: 1876–1930
- Planned: 5
- Completed: 5
- Retired: 5

General characteristics
- Type: Screw gunboat
- Displacement: 1,375 long tons (1,397 t)
- Length: 225–232 ft (69–71 m)
- Beam: 38 ft (12 m)
- Draft: 16.7 ft (5.1 m)
- Installed power: 800 ihp (600 kW)
- Propulsion: 8 × boilers; 1 × engine; 1 × propeller
- Sail plan: Bark-rigged sails
- Speed: 11 knots (20 km/h; 13 mph)
- Complement: 190
- Armament: 4 × 9-inch (23 cm) Dahlgren guns; 1 × pivot gun

The Enterprise-class gunboats were a series of five wooden-hulled, screw-driven gunboats operated by the US Navy in the later half of the 19th and early 20th centuries. The ships were ordered in 1873 when the Navy stalled technologically in the post-Civil War era. Commissioned throughout the decade, the vessels served around the world until the late 1880s. They were then repurposed as either hulks or training ships before they were sold off by 1930.

== Development and design ==
Following the end of the American Civil War, the United States Navy had its budget and role reduced by Congress. In the first decade of peace, the only new ships in service were vessels that were laid down during the war. Congress did not fund the Navy as the nation was focused on reconstruction, developing the west, and the effects of the Long Depression. During the decade, the Navy technologically stalled as European fleets continued to modernize and embrace recent developments in armament. This status quo continued until February 1873, when Congress ordered the construction of eight new gunboats for the Navy. Three featured iron hulls and became the Alert-class gunboats, while the other five had wooden hulls.

The later had a length between perpendiculars of 185 feet (56 m), a beam of 35 feet (11 m), and a draft of 16.3 feet (5.0 m). The design placed a heavy emphasis on seakeeping and ocean-going operations, which lead to a hull design with a greater beam and draft than the Civil War-era gunboats. They displaced 1,375 long tons (1,397 metric tons), several hundred tons more than previous designs such as the Kansas class. The vessels were rigged as barks with about 15,000 square feet (1,400 m^{2}) of canvas and were fitted with an economic two-cylinder vertical compound engine, one propeller, telescopic funnel, and eight boilers. The engine could produce about 800 indicated horsepower (600 kW) and each ship could reach speeds up to 11 knots (20 km/h; 13 mph) under both sail and steam. Armament consisted of four 9-inch (23 cm) Dahlgren guns as a broadside along with a pivot gun mounted amidship that featured either a 9 or 11-inch (28 cm) caliber. The ships' complement consisted of 190 sailors.

== Service history ==
While all five ships were built to the same design, Nipsic was officially a reconstruction of a previous USS Nipsic. The entire class was laid down in either 1873 and 1874, and were only all in service by 1879. A dispute between the builder of Enterprise and the Navy significantly delayed progress on her construction, which made her the last wooden-hull warship authorized by Congress. After entering service, the ships were assigned to various squadrons around the world, although Enterprise was used as a hydrographic survey vessel. Alliance joined the Jeannette Arctic expedition and Nipsic was beached at Samoa in 1889. By the late 1880s, the vessels no longer served abroad and were repurposed as training or receiving ships until they were sold off by 1930.

== Ships in class ==
Data
Name	Builder	Laid down	Launched	Commissioned	Fate
Adams	Boston Navy Yard	1874	24 October 1874	21 July 1876	Sold 1920
Alliance	Norfolk Navy Yard	1873	8 March 1875	8 January 1877	Sold 1911
Enterprise	Portsmouth Navy Yard	1873	13 June 1874	16 March 1877	Sold 1909
Nipsic	Washington Navy Yard	1873	6 June 1878	11 October 1879	Sold 1913
Essex	Portsmouth Navy Yard	1873	26 October 1874	3 October 1876	Sold 1930
