= Pennsylvania Nautical School =

Former educational institution in the United States

Pennsylvania Nautical School existed in Pennsylvania, United States, from 1889 to 1947.

In an effort to meet the nation's demand for trained seamen, the United States Congress passed an Act on June 20, 1874, giving the Secretary of the Navy the authority to provide a naval vessel and instructors for a nautical school to be established at each or any of the ports of New York, Boston, Philadelphia, Baltimore, Norfolk, and San Francisco. To that end, the Pennsylvania Nautical School (PNS) was established in 1889 by the General Assembly of the Commonwealth of Pennsylvania, and for 58 years trained young men for careers in the maritime trades and professions. PNS cadets were taught aboard five different schoolships: USS Saratoga (1889–1907); USS Adams (1907–1914); USS Annapolis (1919–1942); USS Keystone State, ex USCGC Seneca (1942–1946); and USS Keystone State II, ex USS Selinur (1946–1947). Approximately 2,000 cadets graduated from the nautical school before it closed in 1947.

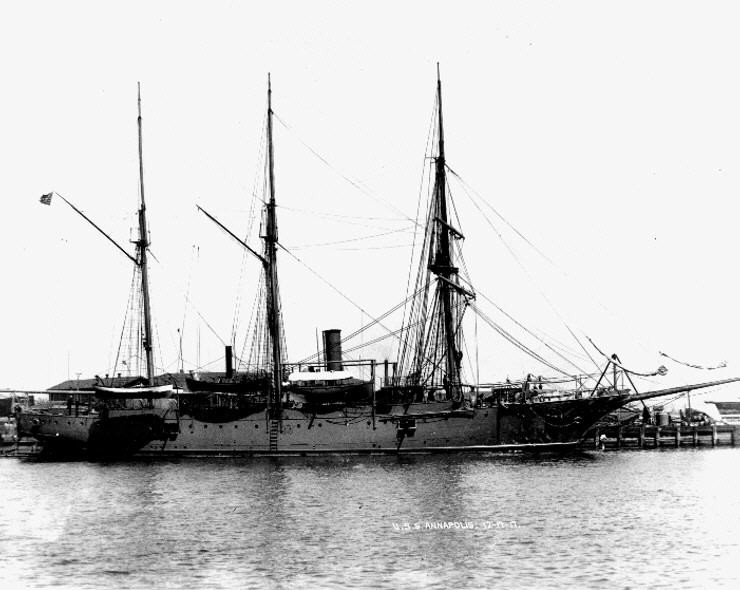
USS Annapolis (PG-10). In wartime gray paint, 1898. Photograph from the Bureau of Ships Collection in the U.S. National Archives.

== History ==
The Pennsylvania Nautical School's first schoolship was the USS Saratoga, a 47-year-old 882-ton sloop of war, named after the Battle of Saratoga of the American Revolutionary War. In 1908, the Saratoga was replaced by the USS Adams, a 1,397-ton screw gunboat. The Adams served for five years until the school was discontinued on February 16, 1914, due to local disagreements and lack of funding by the State Legislature. On July 8, 1919, the Pennsylvania State Legislature reactivated the nautical school and renamed it the Pennsylvania State Nautical School. The USS Annapolis was designated as the nautical school's training vessel until its service ended in 1941. In 1940, the administration of the school was transferred to the United States Maritime Commission and was renamed the Pennsylvania Maritime Academy. In the spring of 1942, the administration ended and the cadets were transferred to the US Merchant Marine Academy in Kings Point, New York. The former Coast Guard cutter USCGC Seneca became the nautical school's fourth schoolship. In September 1942, administration of the school was returned to the State of Pennsylvania, and the Seneca was renamed the USS Keystone State. In 1946, the USS Selinur, renamed USS Keystone State II, became the nautical school's fifth and final schoolship. Lack of state government funding, allegations of cadet's "mutinous behavior", allegations of political corruption, and a decrease in applicants led to the closure of the Pennsylvania Maritime Academy on June 20, 1947.

=== Admission requirements ===
Admission to the Pennsylvania Nautical School was limited to young men between the ages of 16 to 19 years who were United States citizens and residents of the Commonwealth of Pennsylvania and who had a parent or guardian who also was a citizen of the Commonwealth of Pennsylvania. In 1920, the age requirement was raised to ages 17 through 20. As part of the admissions process, applicants had to provide letters of recommendation attesting to their sound "moral character", possess an aptitude for a sea life, as well as pass a physical examination by a board of medical examiners and a rigorous written academic examination in mathematics, literature, and history. Classes were admitted to the nautical school twice a year, in May and October.

Pennsylvania Nautical School image gallery

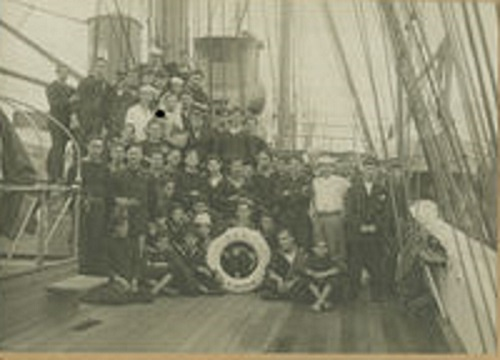
PNS Cadets aboard Schoolship Adams, 1909. Pennsylvania Nautical School Collection, J Henderson Welles Archives and Library, Independence Seaport Museum. Philadelphia, PA

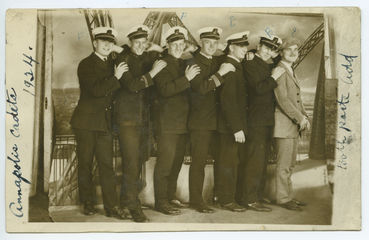
PNS Schoolship Annapolis cadets, 1924. Pennsylvania Nautical School Collection, J Henderson Welles Archives and Library, Independence Seaport Museum. Philadelphia, PA

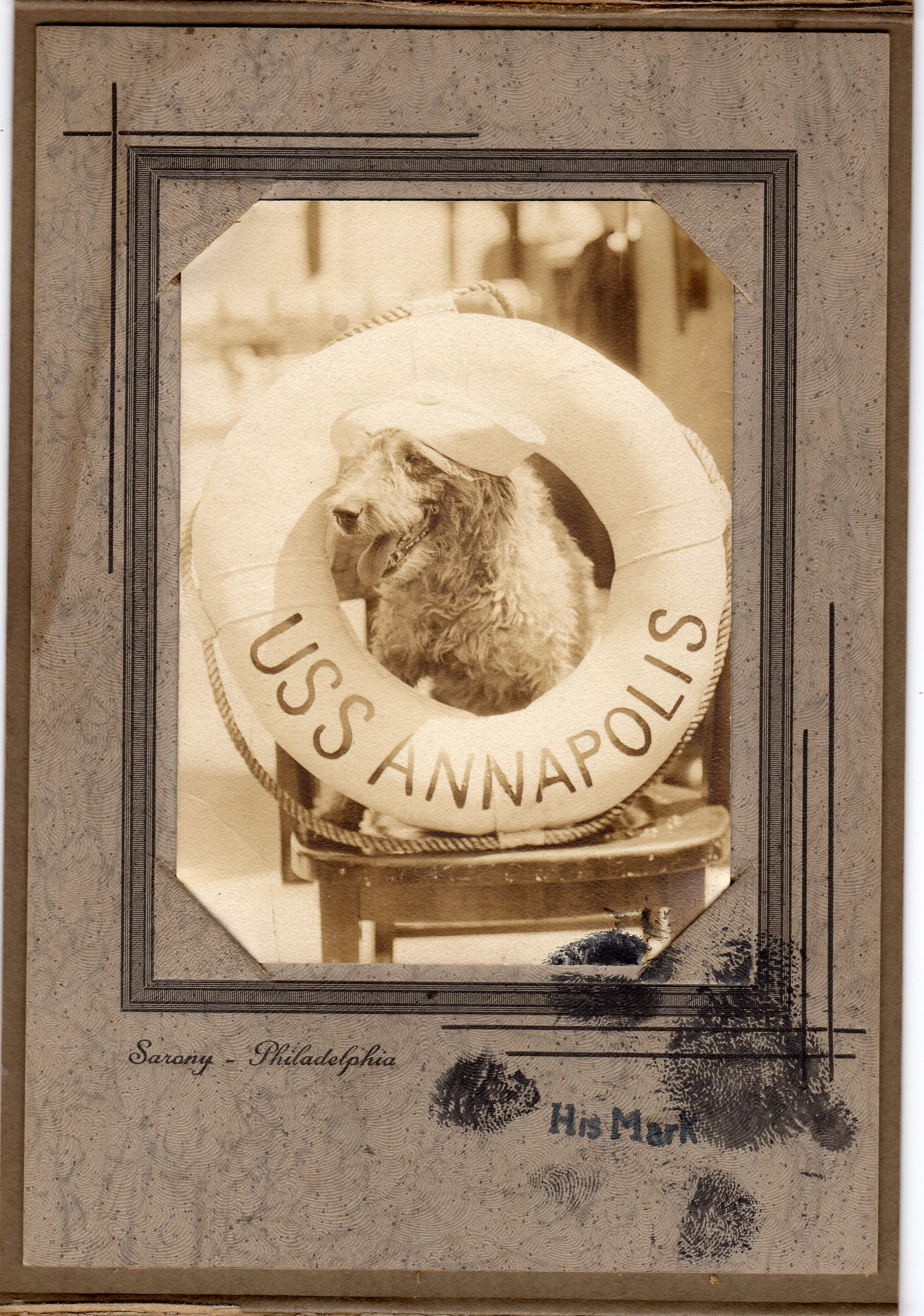
Schoolship Annapolis mascot. Pennsylvania Nautical School Collection, J Henderson Welles Archives and Library, Independence Seaport Museum. Philadelphia, PA

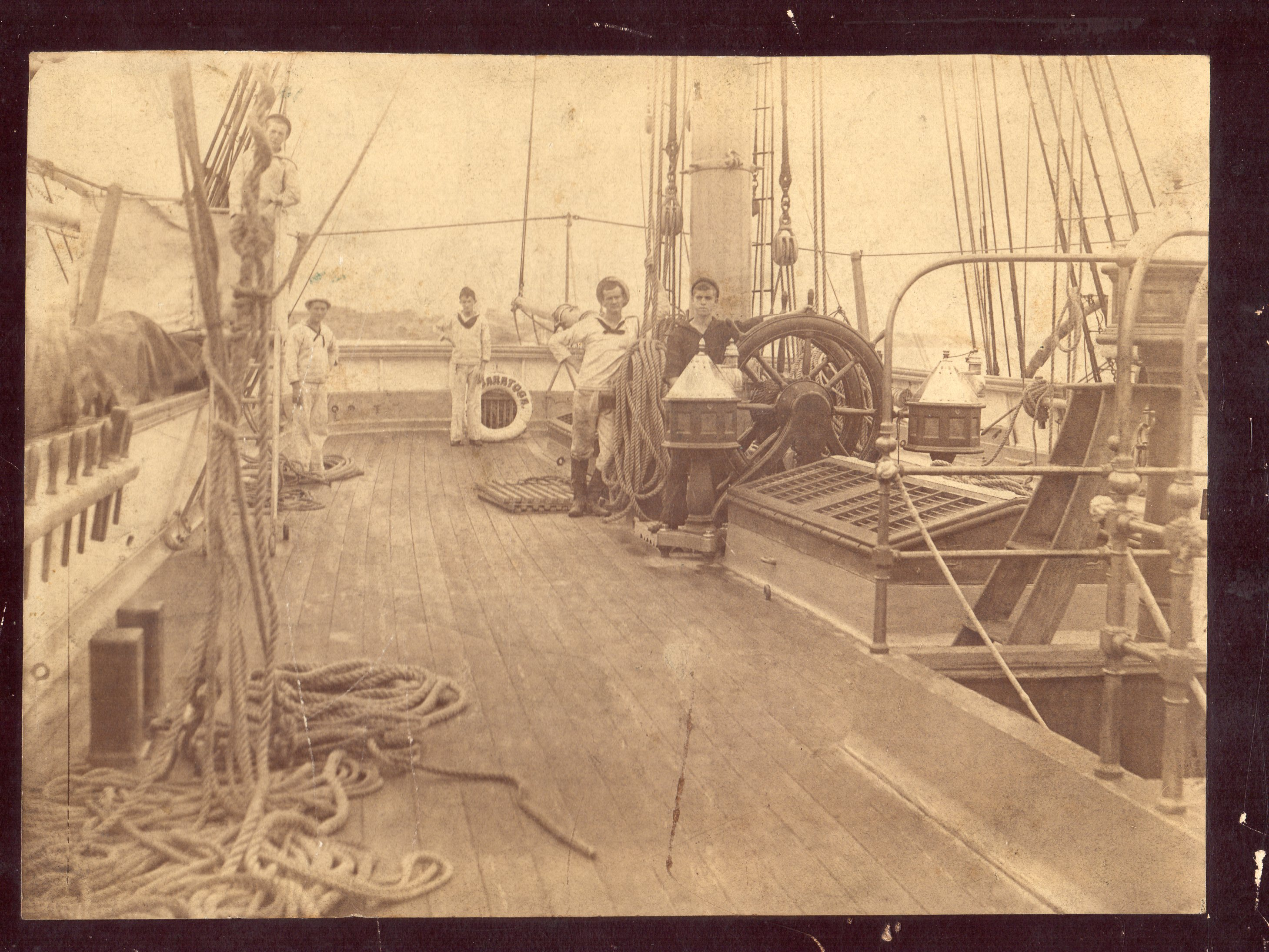
PNS cadets aboard deck of Schoolship Saratoga. Pennsylvania Nautical School Collection, J Henderson Welles Archives and Library, Independence Seaport Museum. Philadelphia, PA

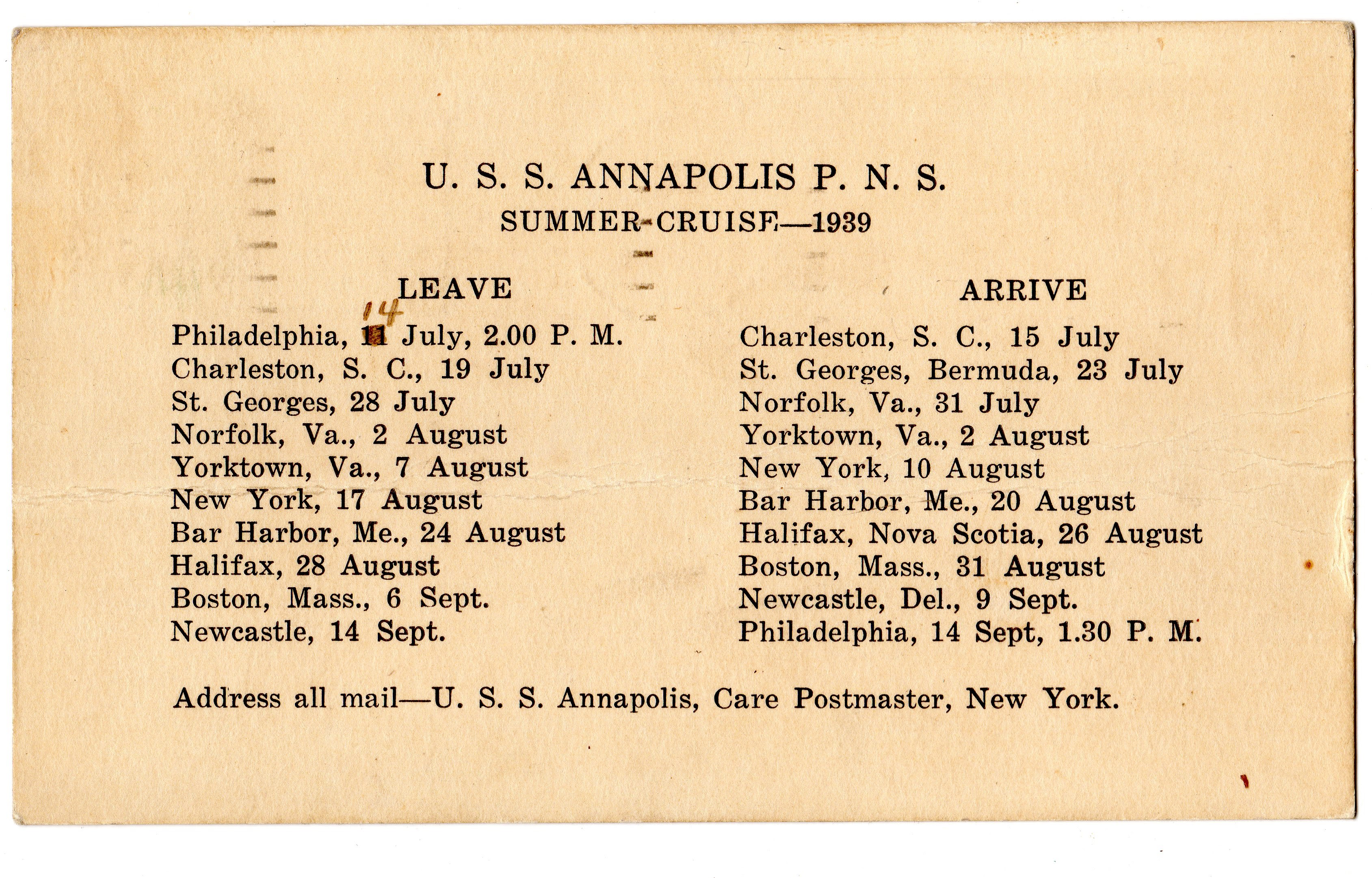
PNS Annapolis Summer cruise itinerary, 1939. Pennsylvania Nautical School Collection, J Henderson Welles Archives and Library, Independence Seaport Museum. Philadelphia, PA

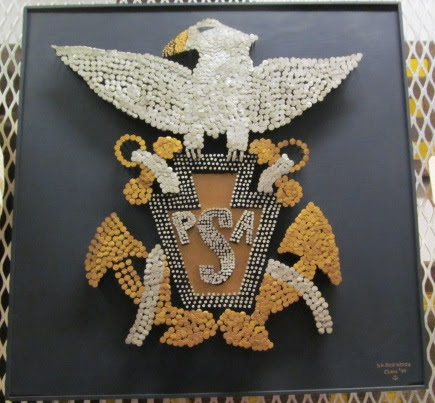
PNS emblem. Nail art. Pennsylvania Nautical School Collection, J Henderson Welles Archives and Library, Independence Seaport Museum. Philadelphia, PA

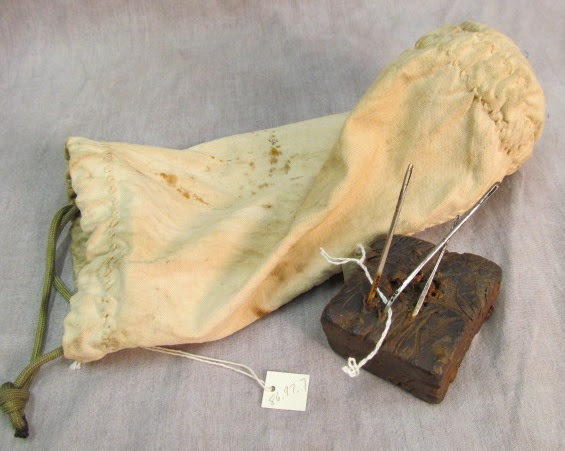
Cadet Robert Ott's ditty bag and steel needles. Pennsylvania Nautical School Collection, J Henderson Welles Archives and Library, Independence Seaport Museum. Philadelphia, PA

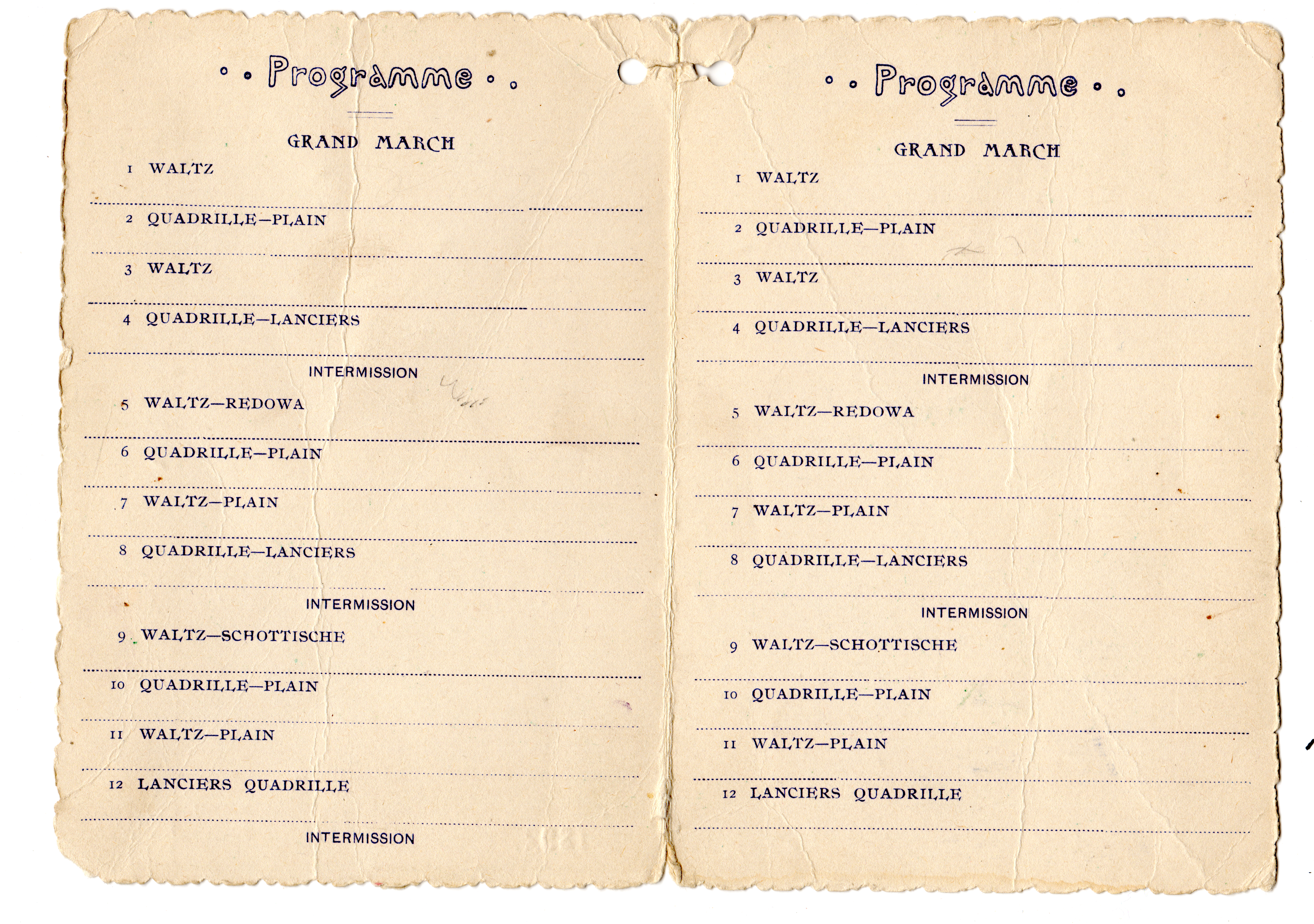
PNS Schoolship Saratoga dance program. 1892. Pennsylvania Nautical School Collection, J Henderson Welles Archives and Library, Independence Seaport Museum. Philadelphia, PA

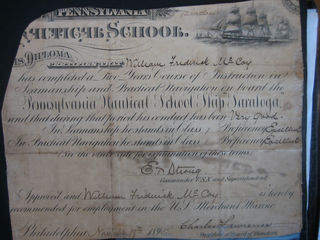
William McCoy Diploma. 1895. McCoy Family Papers Collection, J Henderson Welles Archives and Library, Independence Seaport Museum. Philadelphia, PA

=== Curriculum ===
The Pennsylvania Nautical School's course of training was two years, at the end of which time cadets graduated as third officers and were eligible for an officer's position aboard any American merchant ship. PNS cadets studied navigation, theoretical and practical marine engineering, and seamanship, were taught by Navy officers, and received their training aboard a schoolship, a retired naval ship which was repurposed as a training ship. Coursework was divided into port and sea terms. The schoolship was typically anchored at the port of Philadelphia during port terms and cadets could apply for permission for a leave of absence during the weekends. The sea terms were spent in cruise in foreign or home waters. During sea terms, the schoolship sailed to ports in the United States, Europe, South America and the West Indies. The ship stayed a short time in each of the ports visited so that the cadets could go on shore and see the countries and their people. During the sea terms, cadets devoted most of their time to practical work such as steering, heaving the lead, and handling boats under oars and sail. Athletics also played an important part in the curriculum. Cadets formed baseball, football, swimming, boxing, and track teams. Team uniforms and gear were provided by the school.

=== School publications ===
The school's yearbook was The Helm. The Tarp was a monthly newsletter published by the cadet-midshipmen of the Pennsylvania Maritime Academy (1945–1946).

== Alumni associations ==
The Pennsylvania Nautical School had several alumni associations. The first was the Pennsylvania Nautical School Association (PNSA). PNSA was formed in 1905 and published the short-lived the Log of the PNSA, which later became part of the Log of the American Merchant Training Ships, a monthly publication of the Allied Associations of the Massachusetts, New York, and Pennsylvania Merchant Training Ships.

The Pennsylvania Schoolship Association (PSA) was established in 1955 with the purpose of maintaining contact with shipmates and to preserve the history of the Pennsylvania Nautical School. The PSA held memorial services and organized annual musters until 2014. The PSA published the alumni newsletter The Lookout (1956–2015). The Lookout was written and edited for many years by Class of 1930 graduate Captain Ray Eisenberg, and served as an official news vehicle for the PSA. It featured alumni profiles, articles related to the merchant marine, and reports of association meetings. The PSA also published the Chronicle, a booklet containing alumni information, as well as, articles related to history of the PNS/PMA.

Due to a decreasing membership base and aging alumni and volunteers, the PSA "furled its sails" in 2015. Before disbanding the organization, the PSA decided that it would have to first fulfill the goals below:

- Complete the final issue of The Lookout, volume 50
- Establish an annual memorial Service
- Place a memorial marker or plaque in honor of the Schools' alumni Philadelphia
- Continue to seek moving the USS Annapolis bell to a museum collection
- Promote Pennsylvania Schoolship Association's Legacy Project by the addition of documents, memorabilia, and financial donations to the Independence Seaport Museum's PNS and PMA collection, with funding to support further cataloging and online access to that collection.

The PSA accomplished all of its goals before disbanding in 2015. As of September 2016, alumni are working to move the USS Annapolis bell from over the bar at the Riverside Yacht Club in Essington, Pennsylvania to a Navy-approved location or a museum collection. The PSA published the last issue of The Lookout in Autumn 2015 with Patricia O'Donnell, (widow of PNS graduate, Robert Bellas and wife of Vince O'Donnell President of PSA), serving as editor. An annual memorial mass to honor deceased alumni will be held each year on October 15 thanks to the support of Reverend Edward Brady (son of Dr. Eugene F. Brady '48) at Saint Anne Roman Catholic Church in Philadelphia, Pennsylvania. A permanent Pennsylvania Nautical School and Pennsylvania Maritime Academy Memorial marker was dedicated along the Delaware riverfront at Penn's Landing in front of the Independence Seaport Museum on May 24, 2014 . Lastly, the legacy project donated funds to support further cataloging and online access to the PNS/PMA collection held at the J. Welles Henderson Research Center at Independence Seaport Museum.

== Notable former cadets ==
- Leonard LaRue (Class of 1934) Sailor and Monk. On December 23, 1950, Ship's Master LaRue saved 14,000 Korean refugees, navigating enemy mine fields without the aid of onboard mine detector.
- Richard Ridington (Class of 1942) Navigator on the S.S. United States – the largest and fastest passenger ocean liner that won the Blue Riband for crossing the Atlantic Ocean at record speeds.
- Thomas Wright Rudderow
- RADM Earl Trosino, USNR (Class of 1928) Captured German submarine U-505 during World War II.
- John West Mattis, father of US Secretary Of Defense Jim Mattis
