= USCGC Seneca (1908) =

United States Coast Guard cutter

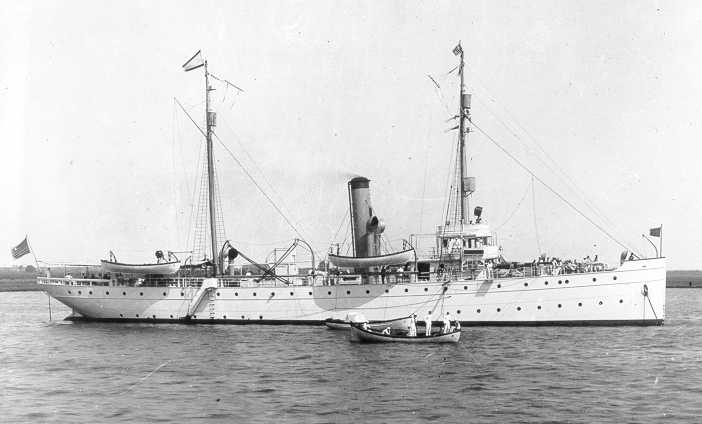
- USCGC Seneca, probably circa 1920s

History

United States
- Name: USRC Seneca (1908 to 1915); USCGC Seneca (1915 and later)
- Namesake: A tribe of the Iroquois Indians
- Operator: United States Coast Guard
- Builder: Newport News Shipbuilding
- Cost: US$244,500
- Launched: 18 March 1908
- Sponsored by: Miss Edith E. Hepburn
- Commissioned: 12 November 1908
- Decommissioned: 21 March 1936
- Fate: Scrapped 1950

General characteristics (Note: Sources don't agree on tonnage and crew size. Larzelere gives displacement at 1445 tons and a peacetime complement of 8 officers, 4 warrant officers and 75 enlisted.)
- Displacement: 1,259 tons
- Length: 204 ft (62 m)
- Beam: 34 ft (10 m)
- Draft: 17 ft 3 in (5.26 m)
- Propulsion: Triple-expansion steam engine, 20 in (0.51 m), 32 in (0.81 m), 52 in (1.3 m) diameter X 36 in (0.91 m) stroke; two boilers
- Speed: 11.2 maximum (1930)
- Complement: 9 officers, 65 enlisted (1908); 8 officers, 4 warrant officers, 75 enlisted; (1917),
- Armament: 4 × 6-pounder (57 mm (2.2 in)) rapid fire guns (1908)

USCGC Seneca, or before 1915 USRC Seneca, was a United States Coast Guard cutter built and commissioned as a "derelict destroyer" with the specific mission of locating and then destroying abandoned shipwrecks that were still afloat and were a menace to navigation. She was designed with excellent sea-keeping qualities, a long cruising range, good towing capabilities, and by necessity the capacity to store a large amount of munitions. She was one of five Coast Guard cutters serving with the U.S. Navy in European waters during World War I.

== Construction ==
Seneca was built as Revenue Cutter 17 by Newport News Shipbuilding, hull number 85 at Newport News, Virginia at a cost of US$244,500 and designed specifically to be used as a derelict destroyer for the Atlantic coast. Floating wrecks, derelicts, were a common menace with international discussions and agreements concerning their elimination and some special cruises made to locate and destroy them. The United States Congress appropriated $250,000 for a vessel to be dedicated exclusively as a "derelict destroyer" equipped and crewed to most effectively eliminate the menace to navigation. Arrangements for vessels spotting derelicts to report them by wireless to the destroyer were planned. As of 1912 the United States was the first nation providing such specialized vessels. As the ship entered service hopes were expressed that her success would inspire other nations to join with such vessels.

She was powered by a triple-expansion steam engine with two Scotch boilers rated at 180 pounds per square inch (1,200 kPa). Seneca was fit with four 6-pounder rapid-fire guns and an unusually large ammunition magazine for the express purpose of destroying floating shipwrecks.

== Prewar service ==
Seneca was accepted by the government on 26 June 1908 and was commissioned by the Revenue Cutter Service at the Revenue Cutter Service Depot at Baltimore, Maryland, on 6 November of that year. On 8 November 1908 she proceeded to Tompkinsville, New York, to assume her principal mission as the derelict destroyer for the Atlantic coast. Her cruising district included the Atlantic Ocean to the eastward of the United States bounded by a line from Portland, Maine, to Sable Island, Nova Scotia, thence to the Bermuda Islands, and then to Charleston, South Carolina.

On 29 November she destroyed her first derelict, a wreck off Hog Island, and then returned to Tompkinsville. On 23 January 1909 Seneca assisted USRC Gresham in the rescue of the crew of the White Star Line SS Republic after a collision with the Lloyd Italiano liner SS Florida 26 miles (42 km) southeast of Nantucket, Massachusetts. She assisted Gresham with the tow in very threatening weather but ultimately Republic sank. Seneca took the crew to New York City. In February the cutter visited Washington, D.C. and in June visited Philadelphia, Pennsylvania. By 29 May 1909 Seneca had destroyed eleven good sized obstructions. On 21 September she was in New York for the Hudson–Fulton Celebration. On 17 May 1910 Seneca visited the United States Military Academy at West Point, New York, and on 28 June she patrolled the Harvard–Yale Regatta at New London, Connecticut. In June 1911, she escorted the presidential yacht USS Mayflower, which had President William Taft and his party on board, from Manhattan Beach to Fall River, Massachusetts.

On 23 May 1912, she was at Philadelphia representing the Revenue Cutter Service at the convention of Permanent International Association of Navigation Congresses. On 29 June she patrolled the course of the Intercollegiate Rowing Association at Poughkeepsie, New York. During 4–6 September Seneca was at New London for the Fifth Convention of Atlantic Deeper Waterways Association. From 12 to 15 October, she patrolled the Navy Mobilization at New York City. On 2 September she patrolled the British International Trophy races at Huntington, Long Island. During the winter of 1912–1913 she took the place of USRC Mohawk on winter cruising.

=== First International Ice Patrol ===
On 29 March 1913, Seneca was assigned to the International Ice Patrol. The RMS Titanic disaster of 14 April 1912, and the loss of 1,517 lives, raised a universal demand for the patrol of the ice zone. Two U.S. Navy scout cruisers, USS Chester and USS Birmingham, had performed this patrol for the remainder of the 1912 ice season. The duty was then turned over in 1913 to the Revenue Cutter Service starting with the Seneca and the USRC Miami. The two cutters alternated patrols that were based out of Halifax, Nova Scotia.

=== Rescue of Columbia survivors ===
On 16 September 1913 she towed the Lottie Russell, a derelict, into Halifax. On 12 April 1914, while on ice patrol, Seneca rescued four survivors from a lifeboat which had been drifting in the North Atlantic for ten days. Originally 14 survivors of the British freighter Columbian had put to sea in this boat, but ten had died of hunger, thirst, and exposure. On 5 July 1914 she proceeded to Labrador to observe and investigate conditions governing the origins of the ice flows.

On 10 August 1914 she was ordered to cooperate with the USS Florida in the enforcement of the neutrality of the United States after the outbreak of war on the European continent. In the winter of 1914–1915 she was again on winter cruising from Gay Head to the Delaware breakwater.

=== Transfer to the newly formed U.S. Coast Guard ===
When the Revenue Cutter Service merged with the United States Life-Saving Service to form the United States Coast Guard on 28 January 1915, she became known as USCGC Seneca, a United States Coast Guard cutter. After winter cruising, she conducted another ice patrol in 1915. She again conducted a winter cruise in the winter of 1915–1916 and then an ice patrol in the spring of 1916. On 13–14 September 1916 the crew participated in the Marine Parade at Philadelphia. The winter of 1916–1917 was her last winter cruise before the war.

== World War I ==
The United States declared war on Germany on 6 April 1917 and Seneca and her crew, along with the rest of the Coast Guard, were transferred to the Navy Department. A battery of four 3-inch (76 mm) guns were installed at the Brooklyn Navy Yard. The cutter was assigned to the Atlantic Patrol Fleet, Squadron Four, with headquarters at Key West, Florida. She arrived there on 22 May, and was assigned the duty to search the waters of Cuba and the Bahama Islands for enemy submarines. On 18 July she was reassigned to Seventh Naval District headquartered at Miami, Florida and assumed coastal patrol duties.

=== Refit ===
Seneca was then selected for convoy duty overseas along with five other larger Coast Guard cutters. (Note: Larzelere cites Seneca along with the cutters Tampa, Ossipee, Manning, Yamacraw, and Algonquin.) She was overhauled and refitted with depth charge equipment at the Morse Dry Dock and Repair Company shipyard in New York. Captain J. H. Brown was detached and Captain William J. Wheeler assumed command before the ship left the United States in the latter part of August.

=== Gibraltar convoy escort ===
She arrived at Gibraltar on 4 September 1917 and was assigned to Squadron Two of the Patrol Forces of the Atlantic Fleet. She began escorting convoys from Gibraltar to Tangiers and other nearby points. She escorted six of these convoys and sighted one enemy submarine on 2 October. On 19 October she escorted her first convoy to England, being the lone escort of eleven merchant ships to Pembroke, Wales, where she arrived on 29 October. During this convoy two of the merchant vessels collided, and one, Usher, was sunk. On 3 November she escorted 14 ships back to Gibraltar, arriving the 11th. On 26 November a submarine was sighted in the moonlight about 2,000 yards (1,800 m) distant. Seneca fired two shots, forcing the submarine to submerge.

On 17 February 1918, lookouts sighted another submarine at 500 yards (460 m) astern. Seneca fired one shot, but owing to the darkness of the night, was unable to determine the results. On 4 March, one of the ships in Seneca's convoy was torpedoed and sunk, but the submarine was not sighted. On the 22nd, new and improved depth charge releasing gear was installed on the cutter.

=== Rescue of Cowslip survivors ===
Early in the morning of 25 March the men on Seneca heard a loud explosion within their convoy, and shortly afterward saw distress rockets in the air. They found the British ship Cowslip had been torpedoed and was sinking. Immediately a boat was put over with Third Lieutenant F. W. Brown in charge. They soon returned with 15 of Cowslip's men, along with one of Cowslip's boats with 19 others. Boatswain P. W. Patterson and a fresh boat crew took Cowslip's boat back, while Lieutenant Brown returned with Seneca's boat. Patterson's boat took 20 survivors on board and towed seven others in a small dinghy. Brown's boat rescued the last 19 on board the sinking vessel. Only five officers and one enlisted man were lost, and they had been killed in the explosion. This rescue was beyond the call of Seneca's duty as the escort vessels were to attack enemy submarines, but it was understood that when a ship was torpedoed the escorts were not expected to expose themselves to a similar fate by stopping to rescue the survivors. However, Captain Wheeler was commended for taking what was considered a "justifiable risk".

=== Torpedo near misses ===
On 29 April 1918 Seneca while escorting a convoy near St. Vincent had one torpedo cross her bow 50 ft (15 m) ahead of her bow and during the avoidance maneuver for that torpedo, a second torpedo passed under her stern, apparently Seneca being too close to the attacker for the torpedo to arm. On 19 May Seneca joined up with what would be her 20th convoy at Falmouth, England. On the 20th she dropped a depth charge over a suspicious oil spot, whereupon a very heavy oil slick came to the surface. On her next convoy Seneca sighted a submarine on 8 June. After firing a torpedo at the cutter that passed close the Seneca's bow, the submarine submerged. Seneca attacked with depth charges and may have sunk the submarine, but they could not remain in the area to investigate further.

=== Rescue of Queen survivors ===
On 25 June, while escorting 29 merchant ships to Gibraltar, Seneca's men heard a terrific explosion, and observing the steamer Queen sinking, they drove Seneca at full speed to the rescue. So badly was the Queen hit that within five minutes of the explosion she was completely out of sight under the water, taking 25 of her men with her, including the commodore of the convoy. Twenty-seven survivors were clinging to the small boats and pieces of floating wreckage. Seneca's No. 1 lifeboat with Third Lieutenant F. W. Brown in charge, was lowered to pick them up. All 27 were safely on board Seneca within 40 minutes. For the remainder of the convoy's run, Captain Wheeler assumed command.

=== Submarine false alarm ===
On her next convoy, the 23rd, she was escorting 25 ships to England when on 13 July one of the ships in the convoy sounded the submarine warning and hoisted a signal reading "submarine to starboard." Seneca immediately stood in that direction, dropping two depth charges on the flank of the convoy as a precautionary measure, and stood full speed in the direction of the submarine some 5,000 yards (4,600 m) off. Seneca then began firing, and expended 28 rounds. Upon closer approach the submarine proved to be a dead whale, floating on its side and bearing a striking resemblance to the conning tower of a submarine. Four holes in the carcass testified to the accuracy of the Seneca's guns.

=== Drama of the Wellington rescue ===
The next convoy the Seneca escorted arrived at Gibraltar 15 August and the following convoy back to England arrived 2 September. The 26th convoy for Seneca, OM-99 (Outbound–Milford Haven), consisted of 21 ships bound for Gibraltar. On 16 September at 11:30 hours the steamship Wellington, a ship in convoy OM-99, was torpedoed and Seneca proceeded at full speed to her assistance. At 11:31 a submarine was sighted a few hundred yards from Wellington. Seneca's crew fired three shots at the submarine before it submerged. Depth charges were dropped and additional shots fired to keep it from resurfacing.

Wellington was in bad condition, having been torpedoed in the forepeak. Her master believed she would stay afloat, but all but eleven of his men refused to remain on board. Seneca First Lieutenant F. W. Brown at once volunteered to assist Wellington's master, and almost the entire crew of Seneca wanted to go with him. Nineteen of these Seneca volunteers were selected to go with Lieutenant Brown to the Wellington, while eleven of the 42 men in Wellington's crew also remained with the master. Lieutenant Brown was to be in charge of the ship, but the master was to navigate her into the nearest port which was Brest, France.

At 12:35 Seneca left Wellington and rejoined the convoy. USS Warrington was on her way to assist Wellington, expecting to reach her by 17:00. Arriving aboard Wellington, Lieutenant Brown posted lookouts, broke out ammunition and started drilling a gun crew, for they were still in sub-infested waters, and on a stricken ship carrying valuable cargo to the allies. Repairs were made below decks and by 12:50 hours the ship began to move ahead. By 14:10 the speed was increased until they were making 7.5 kn (13.9 km/h; 8.6 mph). The ship was taking water in the number 2 hold, but by driving the pumps, the crew held it to a level of 3 ft 6 in (1.07 m). At 18:46 the ship was down by the head, and although Lieutenant Brown was able to stop her and bring her head back up long enough to regain his course, her head went down again and her engines were helpless.

A storm had come up and the seas had grown very heavy, with waves crashing over the bow. There was only one lifeboat on Wellington and Lieutenant Brown mustered all the men abreast of this except for the radio operator and three men on the pumps. It was his intention to remain with these four until all hope of saving the ship was gone, the other men meanwhile standing by in the lifeboat. One Seneca man and seven Wellington men were lowered with the boat, the others to slide down the falls into the boat as soon as it reached the water. Fearful lest the boat be smashed against the ship by the heavy seas, one of Wellington's men chopped the painter and the lifeboat with its eight men drifted away rapidly. They tried to row back, but inexperienced in a pulling boat, they were no match for the heavy seas and strong current.

Lieutenant Brown was left stranded with 18 of his men and five of the Wellington men. He set the men to constructing life-rafts. The bow continued settling. The radio operator was in contact with Warrington and continued sending position reports. Rockets were fired from Wellington, and at 14:30 on the 17th answering rockets from Warrington were seen off the port bow. Wellington listed rapidly and Lieutenant Brown gave the order to abandon ship. He continued signaling with a hand flashlight to Warrington about 1,200 yards (1,100 m) away as the ship's keel turned to a sixty degree angle. Then her boilers exploded and the vessel rose up for her final plunge. Lieutenant Brown jumped and swam clear, searching about for something to which he could cling.

Responding to cries for help he swam about, and finding men clinging to planks advised them to keep their mouths closed to keep out the sea water. Next he swam to some calcium lights and extinguished them so they would not lure his men away from their planks. After about three and a half hours in the water Brown was picked up in an unconscious state. From his long exposure he developed pneumonia. Eight others of Seneca's crew were picked up from the water, but one died shortly afterward. In all, 11 Seneca and five Wellington men perished.

The following awards were made by the Navy: To Acting Machinist William L. Boyce, posthumously: the Navy Distinguished Service Medal and citation. To the following deceased members of the crew, posthumously, the Navy Cross and citation: Water Tender William H. Best; Cook Russell Elan; Gunner's Mate Second Class P. L. Marvelle (USN); Boy First Class James J. Nevins; Coxswain Merton Stellenwarf; Water Tender R. H. Tingard, and Assistant Master at Arms August Zuleger, Coxswain Carl S. Newbury; Water Tender M. M. Ovesen; and Seaman William H. Prime.

The remaining living members of the rescue party were awarded the Navy Cross and citation: First Lieutenant F. W. Brown; Oiler Second Class George W. Christy; Seaman Raymond J. Gorman; Assistant Master at Arms D. E. Grimshaw; Electrician Second Class M. C. Mason; Seaman Anthony Orhelein; Coxswain James C. Osborn; Coxswain Jorge A. Pedersen; and Machinist First Class M. J. Ryan.

Rear Admiral Grant, senior British naval officer at Gibraltar, had this to say of the volunteers: "Lieutenant Brown and the gallant volunteers set an example worthy of the highest traditions of any Service or any Nation." "Seldom in the annals of the sea has there been exhibited such self-abnegation, such cool courage and such unfailing diligence in the face of almost insurmountable difficulties. America is to be congratulated".

After the Wellington episode the Seneca escorted four other convoys, several times encountering submarines.

=== Wartime service summary ===
She was at Gibraltar on 11 November 1918 when the Armistice was signed, ending World War I. Seneca's wartime service included escorting 30 convoys consisting of about 580 ships. Only four were lost, and from them 139 survivors were rescued. Twenty-one responses to submarines were made and only one of these proved to be false—the "dead whale" episode. The cutter had four close calls with torpedoes, and was believed to have sunk one submarine.

== Postwar service ==
After the war Seneca remained at Gibraltar for several months, then returning to the United States via Algeria, France, and England. Several vessels in distress were assisted during this period. When Seneca was returned to the United States Treasury Department on 28 August 1919, she resumed her station at Tompkinsville. In the spring of 1920 she was back on ice patrol. On 14 July she patrolled the International Yacht Race at Sandy Hook, New Jersey. Again in 1921 and 1922 she was on ice patrol.

=== Run aground and refitted ===
On 31 July 1922 a new set of guns were installed at the Washington Navy Yard. On 5 August she ran aground in the Potomac River, off Mathias Point, but suffered no serious casualty. After her ice patrol in the spring of 1923, she patrolled the Harvard–Yale Regatta at New London on 21 June. In July 1923, she was overhauled in Brooklyn and repainted at Annapolis.

=== Seizure of rum runner ===
On 15 November 1923 the Commandant ordered the Coast Guard to seize the vessel Tamoka (ex-Arethusa) and arrest her crew. This vessel belonged to William S. McCoy, notorious rum-runner, and had been hovering along the coast between Nassau, Bahamas and Canadian ports, peddling liquor. On 22 August she had fired upon a boat from Manhattan, attempting to board her.

At 1030 hours on the morning of 24 November Seneca hailed Tomoka in latitude 40° 21.6' North, longitude 73° 49.7' West and ordered her to heave to and be prepared to be boarded and examined. A surfboat with an armed boarding party in charge of Lieutenant L. W. Perkins was sent to go on board and take charge of the vessel. At first Tomoka broke out the British flag and cruised about so that the boarding party would not overtake her. Seneca called her gun crews to quarters, cast loose the number one gun, and then ordered Tomoka to permit the boat to board. The master then complied. At 12:00 the boarding officer reported that he was all right and requested the Seneca to go ahead and he would follow with Tomoka. Seneca shaped a course for the Ambrose Channel lightship, but by 12:30 Tomoka had still not started to follow. Heading back for the rum-runner Seneca was met by her boarding party, which had been chased off Tomoka with a machinegun.

=== Seneca opens fire ===
Seneca then instructed Tomoka that she would be sunk by gunfire unless she proceeded toward New York City. The rum-runner started in that direction, but then suddenly started its engine, hoisted the fore staysail and stood rapidly to eastward. Seneca gave chase and opened fire. The first shot was fired across the bow of the fleeing schooner, then the range was gradually decreased. After three warning shots, a fourth shot was fired to hit. The shell landed alongside a few feet from Tomoka, and the schooner immediately stopped engines, hauled down the fore staysail and headed into the wind with her foresail idly flapping.

Seneca mustered a force armed with rifles, called away a boat, and ordered the master to haul down his foresail. The crew of the schooner, without waiting for instructions from the master, immediately jumped to the sail and hauled it down. Boatswain I. E. Johannessen took an armed boarding party on board Tomoka and ordered the "rummy" crew below decks. Meanwhile, Seneca was lying less than 100 feet (30 m) off, with another armed party on the bow. No further difficulty was encountered. The vessels arrived off Staten Island at 23:30 and turned Tomoka and her crew over to Lexington, including Bill McCoy himself.

=== Various missions ===
After her 1924 ice patrol she was again overhauled, and again patrolled various regattas. On 26 July 1927 she was placed out of commission at Curtis Bay, Maryland but on 20 April 1928 she was recommissioned and reported for duty with the New York Division. On 1 March 1929 she arrived in Washington, D.C. to take part in the inauguration of Herbert Hoover. On 23 September 1932 her permanent station was changed to San Juan, Puerto Rico, and she arrived there on 23 October. On 1 June 1934 her permanent station was changed once again when she moved to Mobile, Alabama, where she served until 28 January 1936, when she was selected to be decommissioned. Proceeding to the depot at Curtis Bay, Seneca had one last opportunity for service when a big freeze came over the Virginia and Maryland coasts. The Chesapeake Bay and the Potomac River froze over, stranding several vessels in the ice. Seneca was called to the rescue. From 21 to 27 February, she stayed busy breaking ice, freeing and rendering assistance to five ice-bound vessels.

== Decommissioned ==
On 21 March 1936 she was decommissioned at the Coast Guard Depot and on 3 September 1936, she was sold to the Boston Iron and Metal Company of Baltimore for US$6,605.00. Seneca was then sold to the Texas Refrigeration Steamship Line and she sailed with them for only a few months before the company went bankrupt. Boston Iron and Metal Company then bought Seneca back at auction.

== Reacquired as training ship ==
She returned to Coast Guard service in 1941 and was overhauled. In 1942 she was turned over to the state of Pennsylvania for use in training merchant and naval cadets at the Pennsylvania Nautical School from 1942 to 1946. She also served as a schoolship in the maritime academies of the states of Massachusetts and New York. Renamed Keystone State, she stayed in that service through 1948. She was then returned to the Maritime Commission and laid up until she was sold for scrap in Baltimore in 1950.

== Notes ==
=== References cited ===
- "Record of Movements, Vessels of the United States Coast Guard, 1790 – December 31, 1933 (1989 reprint)" (PDF). U.S. Coast Guard, Department of Transportation.
- "Seneca (1908)". U.S. Coast Guard History Program. U.S. Coast Guard Historian's Office.
- "U.S. Coast Guard General Order No. 1" (PDF). Historic Documents & Publications. U.S. Coast Guard Historian's Office. 28 January 1915.
- Canney, Donald L. (1995). U.S. Coast Guard and Revenue Cutters, 1790–1935. Annapolis: Naval Institute Press. ISBN 1-55750-101-7.
- Colton, T. (17 January 2022). "Newport News Shipbuilding, Newport News VA". Shipbuilding History. T. Colton.
- Daily Colonist (1909). "Derelict Destroyer is Kept Busy". Daily Colonist. 51 (29 May 1909). Victoria, British Columbia: The Colonist Printing and Publishing Company: 3.
- Eger, Christopher L. (March 2021). "Hudson Fulton Celebration, Part II". Warship International. LVIII (1): 58–81. ISSN 0043-0374.
- Evans, Stephen H. (1949). The United States Coast Guard 1790–1915: A Definitive History. Naval Institute Press, Annapolis, Maryland.
- King, Irving H. (1996). The Coast Guard Expands, 1865–1915: New Roles, New Frontiers. Annapolis: Naval Institute Press. ISBN 1-55750-458-X.
- Knox, Philander C. (1908). "The Future of Commerce—Revenue Cutter No. 17". The Marine Review. 37 (27 February 1908). Cleveland, Ohio: The Penton Publishing Company: 23–26.
- Kroll, C. Douglas (2002). Commodore Ellsworth P. Bertholf: First Commandant of the Coast Guard. Annapolis: Naval Institute Press. ISBN 1-55750-474-1.
- Larzelere, Alex R. (2003). The Coast Guard in World War I: an Untold Story. Annapolis: Naval Institute Press. ISBN 1-55750-476-8.
- Scientific American (1908). "Engineering". Scientific American. Vol. 99, no. 24 October 1908. New York: Munn & Company. p. 275.
- Stebbins, Nathaniel Livermore; Uberuth, Preston H. (1912). The New Navy of the United States (Section: The United States Revenue-Cutter Service (Uberuth). New York: Outing Publishing Company. LCCN 12013625.
