= Friedrich Theodor Vischer =

German novelist, poet, playwright, and writer (1807–1887)

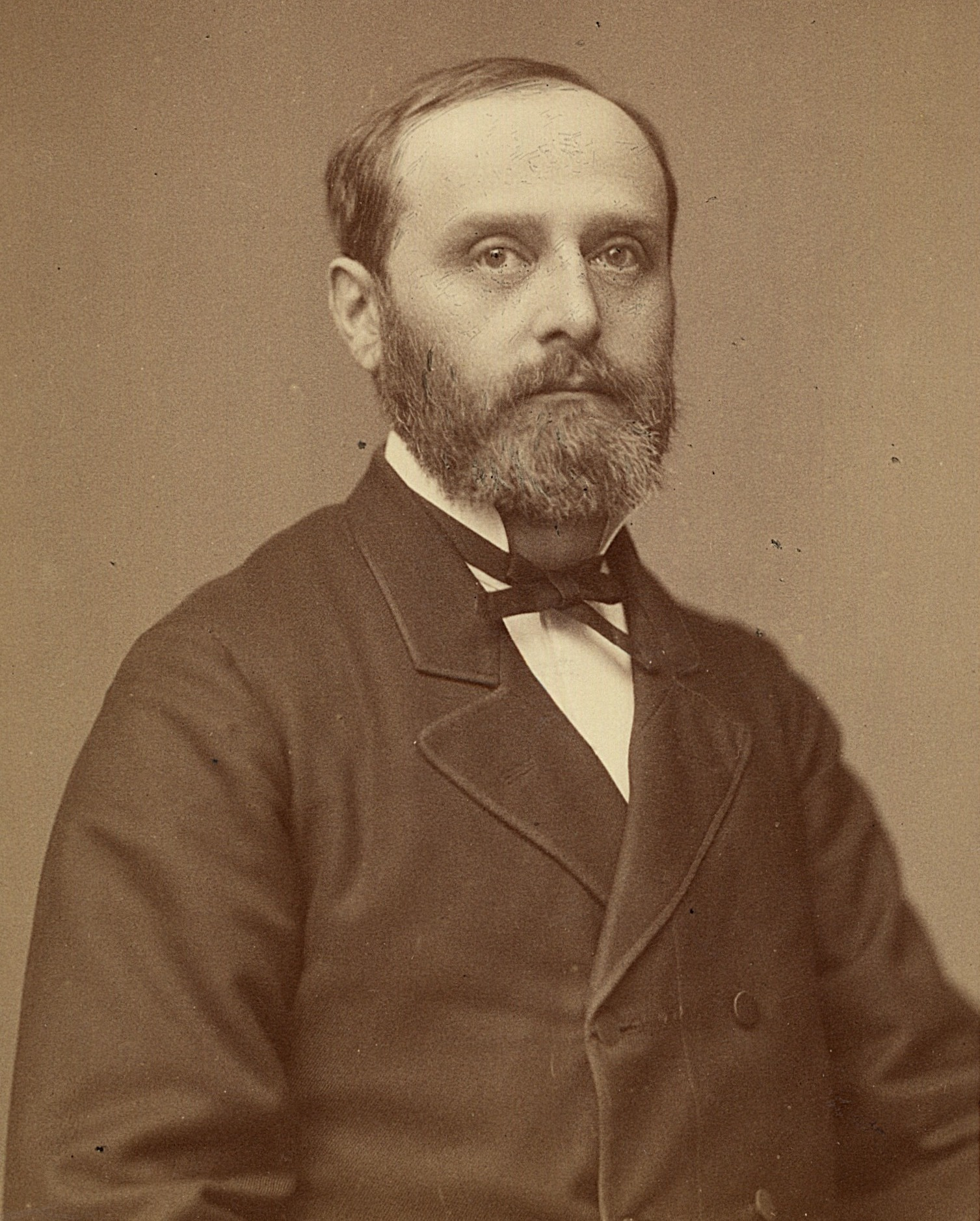
Friedrich Theodor Vischer

Friedrich Theodor Vischer (German: [ˈfɪʃɐ]; 30 June 1807 – 14 September 1887) was a German novelist, poet, playwright, and writer on the philosophy of art. Today, he is mainly remembered as the author of the novel Auch Einer, in which he developed the concept of Die Tücke des Objekts (the spite of objects), a comic theory that inanimate objects conspire against humans.

== Biography ==
Born at Ludwigsburg as the son of a clergyman, Vischer was educated at Tübinger Stift, and began life in his father's profession. He became Privatdozent in aesthetics and German literature at his old university in 1835, was advanced to extraordinary professor two years later, and was appointed to full professor in 1844. Due to his outspoken inaugural address he was suspended for two years by the Württemberg government. In this enforced leisure he wrote the first two volumes of his Aesthetik, oder Wissenschaft des Schönen (1846), the fourth and last volume of which did not appear till 1857.

Vischer threw himself heartily into the great German political movement of 1848-49, and shared the disappointment of patriotic democrats at its failure. In 1855 he became professor at Zürich. In 1866, his fame being now established, he was invited back to Germany with a professorship at Tübingen combined with a post at the Polytechnikum of Stuttgart. He died at Gmunden on 14 September 1887.

== Critical legacy ==
Vischer was not an original thinker, and his monumental Aesthetik, in spite of industry and learning, has not the higher qualities of success. He attempts the hopeless task of explaining art by the Hegelian dialectic. Starting with the definition of beauty as "the idea in the form of limited appearance," he goes on to develop the various elements of art (the beautiful, sublime and comic), and the various forms of art (plastic art, music and poetry) by means of the Hegelian antitheses—form and content, objective and subjective, inner conflict and reconciliation. The shape of the work also is Hegelian, consisting of short highly technical paragraphs containing the main argument, followed by detailed explanations printed in different type.

Vischer had an extensive knowledge of all branches of art except music, and his volumes contain much valuable material.

In later life Vischer moved considerably away from Hegelianism, and adopted the conceptions of sensuous completeness and cosmic harmony as criteria of beauty; but he never found time to rewrite his great book. According to Chisholm, 'His own work as a literary artist is of high quality; vigorous, imaginative and thoughtful without academic technicality.'

He would not abstain from grossly unfair remarks, e. g. in vol. 2 of Auch Einer: "In der lächerlichsten aller Kultursprachen hat Shakespeare geschrieben" about English (Shakespeare wrote in the most ridiculous of all civilized languages), or "Übrigens war der Taugenichts Beyle ein Narr" on Stendhal (Besides, the good-for-nothing Beyle was a fool).

== Selected works ==
- Ueber das Erhabene und Komische und andere Texte zur Philosophie des Schönen, 1837
- Kritische Gänge, 1844
- Aesthetik oder Wissenschaft des Schönen. In six parts, 1846
- Kritische Gänge. Neue Folge. In six parts, 1860
- Faust. Der Tragödie dritter Teil (under the pseudonym Deutobold Symbolizetti Allegoriowitsch Mystifizinsky), a parody of Goethe's Faust: The Second Part of the Tragedy, 1862
- Mein Lebensgang, autobiography, 1874
- Auch Einer. Eine Reisebekanntschaft, novel, 1879 (Digital edition in two volumes from 1900 by the University and State Library Düsseldorf)
- Altes und Neues, 1881
- Lyrische Gänge, poetry, 1882
- Nicht Ia. Schwäbisches Lustspiel in drei Aufzügen, comedy, 1884
- Altes und Neues. Neue Folge, 1889

A complete list of Vischer's works is available on the German Wikipedia.
