= British Cemetery Montevideo Soldiers, Sailors and Airmen =

Coordinates: 34°54′02″S 56°07′45″W

The British Cemetery Montevideo, Uruguay. (Cementerio Británico)
- Established: 1828
- Location: Montevideo, Uruguay
- Website: The British Cemetery

British Cemetery Montevideo Soldiers, Sailors and Airmen contains information about servicemen of different nationalities whose tombs can be found within the Cemetery. A few of the ships mentioned are well known to the general public, such as STV Royston Grange or HMNZS Achilles, which fought in the Battle of the River Plate.

The British Cemetery Montevideo is included in the Roll of Honour and contains eight graves maintained by the Commonwealth War Graves Commission.

== British servicemen ==
=== Early years ===
- Captain Robert Rowley. Commander, Royal Navy. (1817–60).

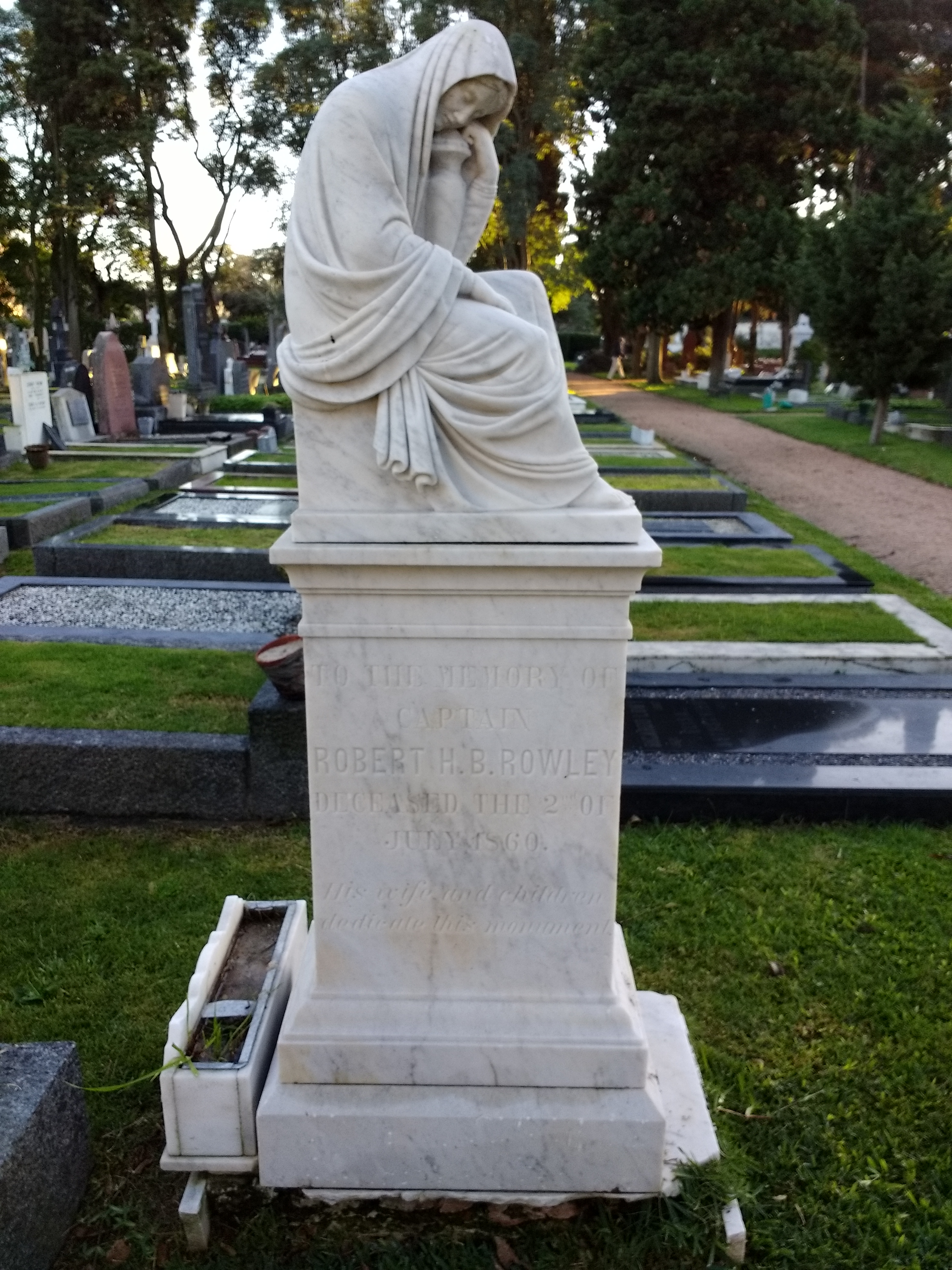
Robert H. B. Rowley's monument

- John Hill. (?–1861). HMS Curacoa.
- Eduard Hall. (?–1865). HMS Satellite. Seaman, HMS Satellite. Drowned off Magdalena 10 May 1865. Aged 20. Native of Walmer, Kent.
- John Tuck. (?–1865). HMS Satellite.
- Charles Moody. (?–1865). HMS Satellite.
- Captain Andrew Anderson. British barque Coronella. (?–1865).
- Robert Walter Craven (1850–1866). Naval Officer, HMS Spiteful. Son of William Craven, 2nd Earl of Craven and Lady Emily Mary Grimston.
- Daniel Hammond. HMS Cracker. (?–1872).
- Richard May Cox. HMS Pylades. (?–1872). Launch, HMS Pylades, Royal Navy. Died 22 November 1872. Aged 32.
- John Bowen. HMS Topaze. (?–1875). Naval Instructor, HMS Topaz, Royal Navy. Died 20 January 1875. Aged 25. Son of the late Rev. Thomas Bowen of Lyonshall, Herefordshire.
- Frank Alexander Ballard. HMS Swallow. (?–1887).
- Pelegrin W.P. Hutton. HMS Ruby. (?–1887).
- Benjamin Howard. HMS Swallow. (?–1888).
- John Hamilton Fields. Sub Lieutenant. HMS Bramble. (?–1890).
- John Cooper. Able Seaman. HMS Bramble. (?–1891).
- Emile Josef Luzzani. WR Steward. HMS Bramble. (?–1891).
- Fred T Pierce. (?–1891). Leading Stoker, HMS Boxer (?), Royal Navy. Died at Montevideo 7 April 1891. Aged 23.
- William Hodgkins. HMS Magpie. (?–1892).
- Alfred Bissoni. HMS Acorn. (1867–1895). Petty Officer 2nd Class, HMS Acorn, Royal Navy. Drowned when a ship's boat capsized on 19th December 1895 at Montevideo.
- James Robert Blight Drody. HMS Acorn. (1867–1895). Ship's Steward, HMS Acorn, Royal Navy. Drowned when a ship's boat capsized on 19th December 1895 at Montevideo.
- George Thomas Gadd. HMS Acorn. (1868–1895). Leading Stoker, HMS Acorn, Royal Navy. Drowned when a ship's boat capsized on 19th December 1895 at Montevideo.
- Isaac Taylor. HMS Acorn. (1864–1895). Leading Stoker, HMS Acorn, Royal Navy. Drowned when a ship's boat capsized on 19th December 1895 at Montevideo.
- Hugh Evelyn Warlow. HMS Acorn. (1874–1895). Writer, HMS Acorn, Royal Navy. Drowned when a ship's boat capsized on 19th December 1895 at Montevideo.
- Alexander Hall. (?–1897).
- Thomas Wasley. (?–1898). RMLI HMS Flora. Private, HMS Flora, Royal Marine Light Infantry. Died 7 July 1898.
- John Hannigan. Beagle-class sloop HMS Basilisk. (?–1899).
- Samuel Ward. HMS Basilisk. (?–1899).
- Arthur J Owen. Apprentice, barque Beeswing. (?–1899).
- William Muggridge. Stoker, HMS Cambrian. (?–1901).
- Captain Norris Goddard. Royal Sussex Regiment. (1834–1901).
- Edward Rogers. HMS Basilisk. (?–1901). Private, HMS Basilisk, Royal Navy. Died at the British Hospital, Montevideo 12 December 1901.
- Edward Albert Litley. stoker, HMS Scylla. (?–1906).

=== 1914–18 ===
- George Fryat. HMS Newcastle. (?–1918). Private CH/17750, HMS Newcastle, Royal Marine Light Infantry. Died 22 May 1918. Aged 18. Son of Mrs. Rose Ann Dodd, of 3, New Council Cottages, White Notley, Witham, Essex.
- Charles W. Howells. SS Treinta y Tres. (?–1919). Seaman 24444A, SS Trenta-y-Tres, Royal Naval Reserve. Died 4 January 1919. Aged 26. Son of the late Thomas and Annie Louisa Howells. Born at Tenby, Pembrokeshire.
- Ralph Hirst (?–1921). Sergeant 31115, 8th Battalion, East Surrey Regiment. Died 25 July 1921. Aged 32. Son of Mrs. Mary Kate Hirst, of 48 Shaftesbury Avenue, Southsea, Hants.
- Angus Coubrough. Ex-serviceman 1914–18 war. (1897–1978).
- Captain Frank Shingleton (1888–1921). Civil Air Instructor RAF. 1914–18 war.
- Ronald George Burt, Dorset Regiment (?–1921). 1914–18 war.
- Sergeant Alec Chatterton, King Edward's Horse (1884–1925). 1914–18 war.
- Mitchell Caldwell, Loyal North Lancashire Regiment (?–1923). 1914–18 war.
- Commander Lloyd Hirst OBE, Royal Navy. (1887–1974). 1914–18 war. Author of Coronel & After, published 1934.
- Lieut Henry "Harry" Bowen Davies. DFC. (1896–1976). 1914–18 war.

=== 1939–45 ===
- Neville Gervaise Milburn. (?–1939). Ordinary Telegraphist D/SSX 23288, HMNZS Achilles, Royal Navy. Died 13 December 1939. Aged 19.
- A N Other. (?–1939). HMNZS Achilles, Royal Navy. Died 13 December 1939.
- Frank Stennet. (?–1939). Telegraphist D/JX 148899, HMNZS Achilles, Royal Navy. Died 13 December 1939. Aged 18. Son of Frank and Jessie Stennett, of Hazel Grove; stepson of Eveline Stennett, of Hazel Grove, Gtr. Manchester.
- J.F. Jackson. HMS President. (?–1943). Able Seaman D/JX 306000, HMS President, Royal Navy attached to the Dutch tug Thames. Died 8 March 1943. Aged 19. Son of William Henry and Margaret Ann Jackson, of Orrell, Lancashire.
- G.W. Pordage (?–1942). Royal Artillery. Gunner 11276035, 3 Battery, 2 Maritime Light A.A. Regiment, Royal Artillery. Died 24 September 1942. Aged 19. Son of William George and Mary Ann Elizabeth Pordage, of Bromley-by-Bow, London.
- James Goodwin. SS San Castro. (?–1945). Fireman, SS San Castro (London), Merchant Navy. Died 13 October 1945. Aged 34.
- Stuart Paterson. (?–1940). HMS Seapool.
- John Hyland, OBE. RAF pilot 1942–46. (1923–2008).
- John Alexander Drever. Sergeant Gunner and wireless operator, RAF. Volunteer from Uruguay. Enlisted 5 August 1940. Reported missing February 1942, subsequently reported as Prisoner of War in Italy. (1918–78).
- Commander Adrian Lloyd Hirst, Royal Navy.(1917–94). 1939–45 war. Author of Britons at Maldonado, published 1975.

== US servicemen ==
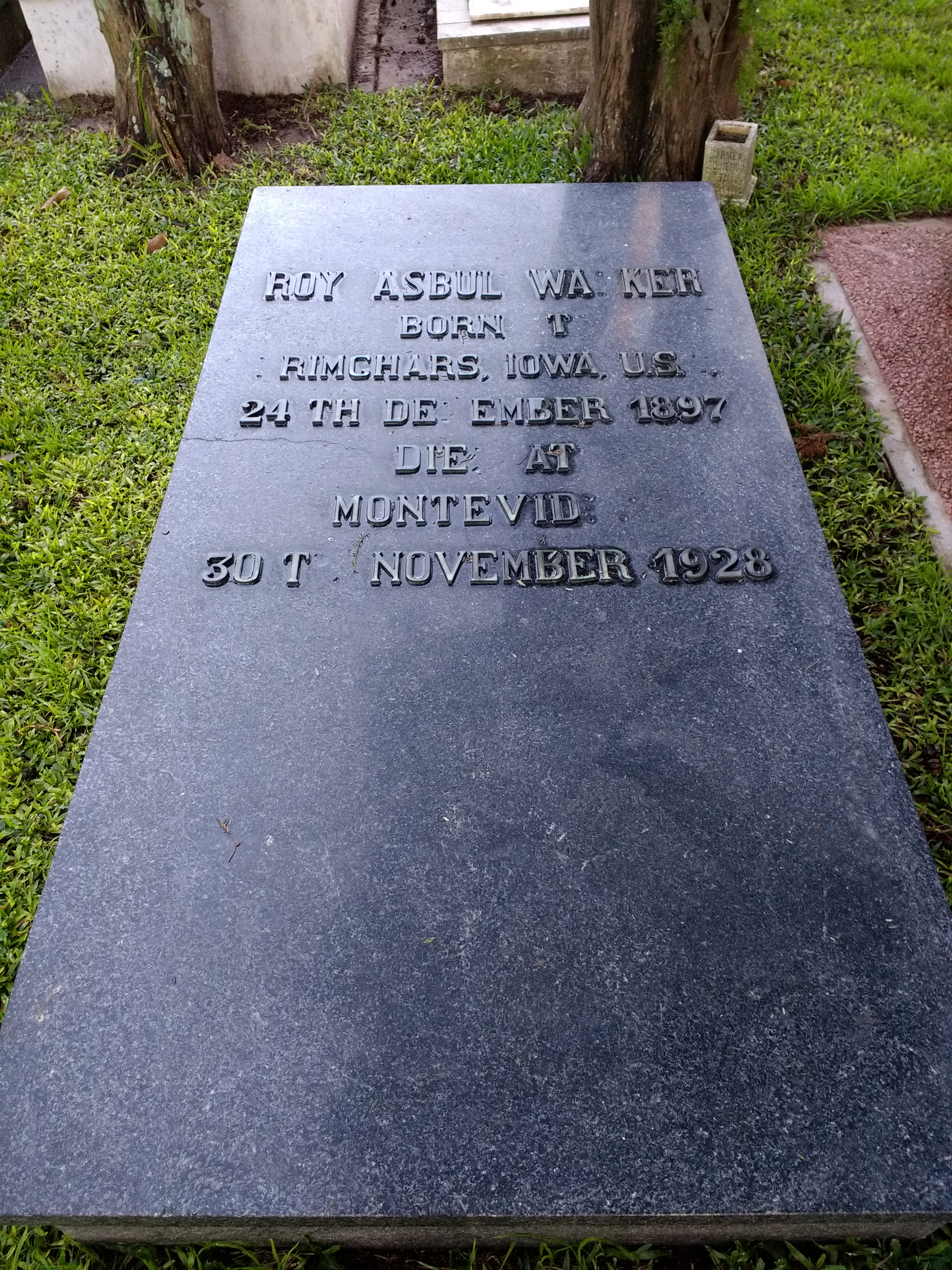
Grave of Roy Asbul Walker

- George Brown. USS Germantown. (?–1854).
- Henry Bright. USS Congress. (?–1861).
- John Robinson. USS Brooklyn. (?–1861).
- Andrew Weaver. USS Pulaski. (1843–61).
- Capt. W.H. Smyly. (d. 1865). US Consul, Falkland Islands.
- Michael Ford. USS Wasp. (?–1868).
- S.W, Kellogg. USS Brooklyn. (?–1867).
- Henry De Costa. USS Ticonderoga.(?–1872).
- John Purnell Wallis. USS Marion (1849–80).
- Charles Green Armourer. USS Marion (1841–80).
- John Rogers. USS Marion (?–1880).
- Harvey Wike. USS Marion (?–1880).
- John Smith. USS Tallapoosa. (?–1888).
- George Mansfield Totten. (?–1888). Lt Cdr US Navy.
- Herbert Garrison. USS Tallapoosa. (1870–89).
- William Bates. Pvt. US Marine Corps. USS Tallapoosa. (1866–89).
- George Rack. USS Tallapoosa.(1869–1891).
- Frank Mrzyk. USS Newark. (1866–95).
- Louis Gorden. USS Chicago. (1880–1901).
- Samuel Maynard Davies. USS Newark. (?–1903).
- Frederick Crocker (1821–1911). US naval commander and Consul.
- Howard Tinsley. (d. 1927). US Consul.
- Roy Asbul Walker. (1897–1928).
- Federico Weimer. US Navy. (d. 1945).
- Lorenzo Caliendo. Col US Air Force World War II, Korea, Vietnam. (1919–1984).

== German sailors from the Battle of the River Plate who settled in Montevideo ==
- Gustav Friedrich Adolph Quick. Admiral Graf Spee. (1918–2007).
- Kurt Gabriel. Admiral Graf Spee. (1919–2003).
- Hans Jahn Ritcher. Admiral Graf Spee. (1919–99).

== STV Royston Grange ==
- STV Royston Grange was a British cargo liner, built in 1959 and owned by the Houlder Line. It was destroyed by fire after a collision in the Rio de la Plata on 11 May 1972. Those who died are buried at the British Cemetery.

== Sailors' Corner ==
This Section of the British Cemetery contains the graves of quite a number of sailors of different nationalities, although the majority are of British descent. Some served with the Armed Forces, and others are from merchant ships that were in the River Plate area at the time.

- John Legge MacCaskie. SS Ormidale. (1876–98).
- Alexander MacDonald. (?–1914). SS Duquesa.
- Henning Anthonsen. (?–1928). SS Berta.
- William Cowell. (?–1928). SS Essex Heath.
- Arthur Turner. (?–1928). SS Dunster Grey.
- William Bird. (?–1930). Cattle Carrier.
- Arthur Henry Broome. (?–1930). SS Port Pirie.
- Agusto Kergauk. (?–1930). SS Leighton.
- John Murphy. (?–1930).
- Richard Henry Watson. (?–1930). SS Victorian Transpor.
- George Williams. (?–1930). SS Princesa.
- William Brotchie. (?–1931). Master SS Bridgepool.
- Timothy Quigley. (?–1931). SS Duquesa.
- Frederick Mayfield. (?–1931). SS Harpalyce.
- Arthur Owens. (?–1934). SS Fighton.
- Allan Ramsay Simons. (?–1934). SS Rio Blanco.
- Jack Andrew. (?–1935). SS Elsister.
- Robert Hugill. (?–1935). SS Saitwick.
- Herbert Arturo Karlsson. (?–1935). SS Tijuca.
- John W. Austin. (?–1936). SS Nariva.
- David Reid. (?–1936). SS Sheaf Spear.
- Alfred Marker Souter. (1888–1936). Master SS Olive Grove.
- James Schmidt. (?–1937). SS Barroland.
- Ali Awaid. (?–1938). SS Clan McNair.
- Patrick O'Brien. (?–1938). SS Harpenden.
- Ian David Ainsworth. (?–1939).
- Francis D'Arcy. (?–1940). SS San Felix.
- Cyril Mansell Groves. (?–1940). Master SS Stangrandt.
- Tabeth Nagi Jussem. (?–1940). SS Stangrandt.
- Stuart Paterson. (?–1940). SS Seapool.
- George Clark. (?–1941). SS Scottish Star.
- Alan Moore. (?–1941). SS Sabor.
- Sinion Adenipekun. (?–1942). SS Veerhaven.
- Fredrick Balding. (?–1943). SS Tamarka.
- James Greighton. (?–1943). SS Baronesa.
- William Archibald. (?–1946). SS Port Adelaide.
- E.D. Blanchard. ( – ).

== Other locations in the cemetery ==
- Captain Carnils Holsch. Blankenelf. (1819–61).
- J.H. Sleeden. SS High Pleigh. (?–1894).
- Capt. Julius Riedel. (1840–97).
- Johan Kilgures. (?–1899). SS Hindoustan.
- Hinrich Wiese. (1855–1902).
- Carl Pundt. SS Wittekind. (?–1902).
- Walter Dickson. SS Service. (?–1902).
- John Crosby. SS Phoenicia. (?–1902).
- John Goodwillie. Chief Engineer, SS Braga. (?–1906).
- James Pelorus. SS Pelorus. (?–1908).
- Thomas Jorgensen Barland. (1879–1909). SS Madura Af Drammen
- Captain Martin Reinersten. (1881–1910).
- Ernesto Muhle. Captain, SS Schlesien. (?–1910).
- Harold Athelstan Thompson. SS Zuleika. (?–1915).
- Edward Hicks. SS Rio Negro. (?–1918).
- William Morris. SS Saint Dunst. (1893–1919).
- William Finlison. SS Hyathis. (?–1919).
- Ernest Charles Rowntree. SS Abercorn. (1903–1919).
- Horace Carey. SS Falkland. (?–1919).
- Edwin Bush. Officer, British barque Kerman. (?–1919).
- John Beatie. SS Highland Rover.(?–1920).
- David McCleod. Redeemed. (1900–21).
- Thomas Hickey. SS Marshal Haig. (?–1921).
- George Jarvis. SS Duquesa. (?–1924).
- Joseph Pearson. SS Duquesa. (?–1924).
- Carlos Peco. SS Duquesa. (?–1924).
- John Jones. SS Cambrian Maid. (1908–1924).
- Francis Pope. SS Abadesa (?–1925).
- Edward Dennis. SS Hyathis. (?–1925).
- David Prichard. SS Cambrian Duchess. (?–1925).
- Arthur Wilfred Bennington Bestley. SS Jersymoor (?–1927).
- Alexander Ferraro. SS Ardenhall (?-1931).
- Jock.K.C. Stevenson. SS Marslew. (1894–1931).
- William Russell. SS Coracero (?–1934).
- Michael Dunlop. SS Alpena (?–1934).
- Olger Andersen. SS Braker (?–1947).
- Captain Evelyn Fitzherbert. (1886–1949).
- Captain Vladimir Evdokimoff. (1893–1949).
- Frederick John Rigden. SS "Laguna". (1919–54).
- William Canavan. SS El Pirlo (?-1954).
- Norman Leslie. Bosun, Highland Monarch. (?–1956).
- Captain Robert Reid. (?–1960).
- James Harkiss. Darwin (?-1968).
- Captain Percy Fry. (1899–1984).
- Nils J. Nilsen. barque Axel.
