= HMS Nymphe (1888) =

Sloop of the Royal Navy

History

United Kingdom
- Name: HMS Nymphe
- Builder: Portsmouth Dockyard.
- Cost: £42,400 (hull) & £15,200 (machinery)
- Laid down: 5 July 1887
- Launched: 1 May 1888
- Commissioned: 3 July 1889
- Fate: Sold, February 1920

General characteristics
- Displacement: 1,140 long tons (1,160 t)
- Length: 195 ft (59.4 m)
- Beam: 28 ft (8.5 m)
- Draught: 12 ft 6 in (3.8 m)
- Propulsion: Horizontal triple-expansion steam engines; 2 shafts; 2,000 ihp (1,500 kW)
- Sail plan: Schooner-rigged
- Speed: 14.5 kn (26.9 km/h; 16.7 mph)
- Endurance: 3,000 nmi (5,600 km; 3,500 mi) at 10 kn (19 km/h; 12 mph)
- Complement: 138
- Armament: 8 × BL 5-inch (127.0 mm) guns; 4 × 1 inch Nordenfeldt machine guns; 4 × .45 inch Gardner machine guns

HMS Nymphe was a Nymphe-class composite screw sloop and the fifth ship of the Royal Navy to bear the name. She was renamed HMS Wildfire in 1906, HMS Gannet in 1916, and finally HMS Pembroke in 1917, before she was sold in 1920.

== Construction and service history ==
Developed and constructed for the Royal Navy on a design by William Henry White, Director of Naval Construction, she was launched at Sheerness Dockyard on 1 May 1888.

Commander Richard Bowles Farquhar was in command until 16 February 1900, when she paid off at Portsmouth for repairs.

== Fate ==
From August 1914 she was a shore training ship at Sheerness, was later renamed Wildfire and was sold to Ward of Milford Haven for breaking in February 1920.

== Bibliography ==
- Lyon, David & Winfield, Rif (2004). The Sail and Steam Navy List: All the Ships of the Royal Navy 1815–1889. Chatham Publishing. ISBN 978-1-86176-032-6. OCLC 52620555.
- Preston, Antony; Major, John (2007). Send a Gunboat: The Victorian Navy and Supremacy at Sea, 1854–1904 (2nd ed.). London: Conway. ISBN 978-0-85177-923-2.
