= HMS Daphne =

At least six ships of the Royal Navy, have been named HMS Daphne after the naiad Daphne:

- HMS Daphne (1776), was a Sphinx-class post ship that the French Navy captured in the Channel in December 1794. HMS Anson recaptured her in December 1797. She was sold in May 1802.
- HMS Daphne was the Dutch Sireene, launched in 1786, captured in 1796 at the capitulation of Saldanha Bay, and brought into service as a 24-gun post ship. She was converted to a prison ship in 1798 and renamed HMS Laurel; she was sold in 1821.
- HMS Daphne (1806) was a Banterer-class post ship that served primarily in the Baltic and that the Navy sold in 1816. She then became the mercantile Daphne and made one voyage transporting convicts to New South Wales and later trading with India; she was last listed in 1823
- HMS Daphne (1838), an 18-gun corvette
- HMS Daphne (1866), an Amazon-class steam sloop
- HMS Daphne (1888), a Nymphe-class composite screw sloop
- HMS Daphne (1915), an Acacia-class sweeping sloop

== See also ==
- Hired armed lugger Daphne, a lugger that served in the Royal Navy as a hired armed vessel from 2 November 1794 to 19 December 1796
