= Basiliscus (disambiguation) =

Basiliscus was the Eastern Roman (Byzantine) Emperor from 475 to 476.

Basiliscus may also refer to:

- Basiliscus (Caesar), Caesar of the East Roman Empire in 476–477/8 and later bishop of Cyzicus
- Basiliscus of Comana (died c. 310), Greek martyr.
- Basiliscus (lizard), a genus of large corytophanid lizards, commonly known as basilisks
- Crotalus basiliscus, a species of snake

== See also ==
- Basilisk (disambiguation)
