= HMS Buzzard (1887) =

Sloop of the Royal Navy

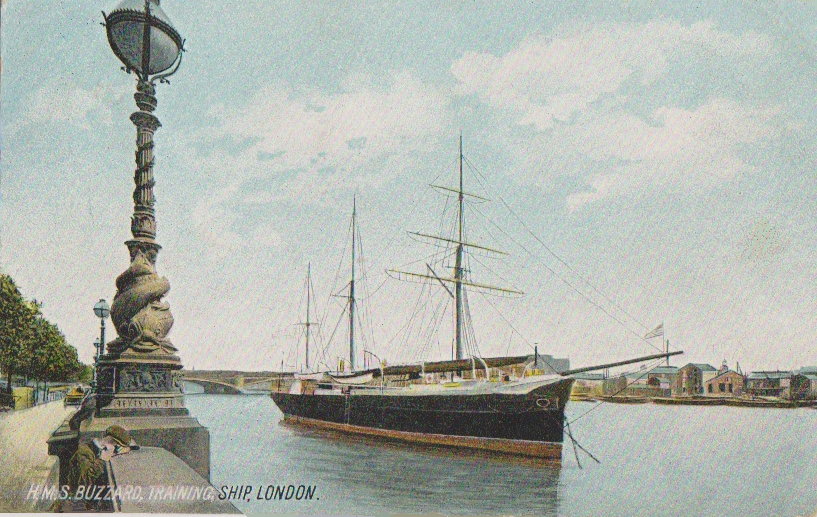
- HMS Buzzard at Blackfriars on the Thames in 1906

History

United Kingdom
- Name: HMS Buzzard
- Builder: Sheerness Dockyard
- Cost: Hull: £42,500; Machinery: £16,200
- Laid down: 1 May 1886
- Launched: 10 May 1887
- Commissioned: 14 April 1888
- Fate: Sold for scrap on 6 September 1921

General characteristics
- Class & type: Nymphe-class sloop
- Tonnage: 584 tons
- Displacement: 1,140 tons
- Length: 195 ft 0 in (59.4 m) pp
- Beam: 28 ft 0 in (8.5 m)
- Draught: 12 ft 6 in (3.8 m)
- Installed power: 2,000 ihp (1,500 kW)
- Propulsion: Horizontal triple-expansion steam engine; Twin screw
- Sail plan: Barquentine rigged
- Speed: 14.5 kn (26.9 km/h)
- Range: 3,000 nmi (5,600 km) at 10 kn (19 km/h)
- Complement: 135
- Armament: 8 × BL 5-inch (127.0 mm) guns; 4 × 1 inch Nordenfeldt machine guns; 4 × .45 inch Gardner machine guns

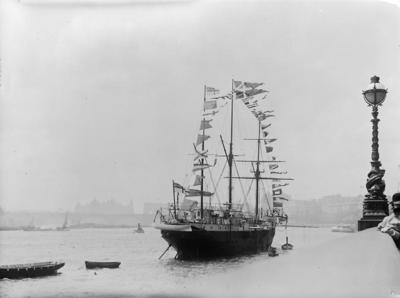
Buzzard on the Thames in June 1907

HMS Buzzard was a Nymphe-class composite screw sloop and the fourth ship of the Royal Navy to bear the name.

== Design ==
Developed and constructed for the Royal Navy on a design by William Henry White, Director of Naval Construction, she was launched at Sheerness Dockyard on 10 May 1887.

== Foreign service ==
The Nymphe-class sloops were ideal for service in the far distant outposts of the British Empire, and Buzzard was employed on the North America and West Indies Station. In early April 1902, under the command of Commander Leicester Francis Gartside Tippinge (1855–1938), she left Bermuda for home waters, calling at Faial Island, before she arrived at Devonport on 20 April. She was paid off at Chatham on 13 May 1902.

== Harbour training ship ==
In 1904 she was converted to a drill ship for the Royal Naval Volunteer Reserve at Blackfriars, London, and in 1911 Buzzard relieved HMS President (formerly HMS Gannet of 1878) as headquarters ship, being renamed HMS President on 1 April 1911.

== Disposal ==
As President she served until 23 January 1918, when she was lent to the Marine Society. She was sold to C A Beard for breaking on 6 September 1921, and was later re-sold to Dutch ship breakers.
