= HMS Daphne (1888) =

Ship, 1888

History

United Kingdom
- Name: HMS Daphne
- Builder: Portsmouth Dockyard
- Laid down: 20 June 1887
- Launched: 29 May 1888
- Completed: May 1889
- Fate: Sold 1904

General characteristics
- Class & type: Nymphe-class sloop
- Displacement: 1,140 long tons (1,160 t)
- Length: 195 ft (59.4 m)
- Beam: 28 ft (8.5 m)
- Draught: 12 ft 6 in (3.8 m)
- Propulsion: Horizontal triple-expansion steam engines; 2 shafts; 1,570 ihp (1,170 kW)
- Sail plan: Schooner-rigged
- Speed: 13.5 kn (25.0 km/h; 15.5 mph)
- Endurance: 3,000 nmi (5,600 km; 3,500 mi) at 10 kn (19 km/h; 12 mph)
- Complement: 138
- Armament: 8 × BL 5-inch (127 mm) guns 8 × machine guns

HMS Daphne was a Nymphe-class composite screw sloop and the fifth ship of the Royal Navy to bear the name. Developed and constructed for the Royal Navy on a design by William Henry White, Director of Naval Construction, she was launched at Sheerness Dockyard on 29 May 1888. It was the first command of Admiral Sir William Christopher Pakenham, KCB, KCMG, KCVO.

== Publications ==
- Chesneau, Roger; Kolesnik, Eugene M. (1979). Conway's All The World's Fighting Ships 1860–1905. London: Conway Maritime Press. ISBN 0-85177-133-5.
- Colledge, J. J.; Warlow, Ben (2006) [1969]. Ships of the Royal Navy: The Complete Record of All Fighting Ships of the Royal Navy from the 15th Century to the Present (3rd Rev ed.). London: Chatham Publishing. ISBN 978-1-86176-281-8. OCLC 67375475.
- Preston, Antony; Major, John (2007). Send a Gunboat: The Victorian Navy and Supremacy at Sea, 1854–1904 (2nd ed.). London: Conway. ISBN 978-0-85177-923-2.
- Lyon, David & Winfield, Rif (2004). The Sail and Steam Navy List: All the Ships of the Royal Navy 1815–1889. Chatham Publishing. ISBN 978-1-86176-032-6. OCLC 52620555.
