= HMS Swallow (1885) =

Sloop of the Royal Navy

History

United Kingdom
- Name: HMS Swallow
- Builder: Sheerness Dockyard
- Cost: £44,797 (hull), £15,000 (machinery)
- Laid down: 1 November 1885
- Launched: 27 October 1885
- Commissioned: 7 October 1886
- Fate: Sold 1904

General characteristics
- Displacement: 1,140 long tons (1,160 t)
- Length: 195 ft (59.4 m)
- Beam: 28 ft (8.5 m)
- Draught: 12 ft 6 in (3.8 m)
- Propulsion: Horizontal triple-expansion steam engines; 2 shafts; 1,570 ihp (1,170 kW)
- Sail plan: Schooner-rigged
- Speed: 13.5 kn (25.0 km/h; 15.5 mph)
- Endurance: 3,000 nmi (5,600 km; 3,500 mi) at 10 kn (19 km/h; 12 mph)
- Complement: 138
- Armament: 8 × BL 5-inch (127.0 mm) guns; 4 × 1 inch Nordenfeldt machine guns; 4 × .45 inch Gardner machine guns

HMS Swallow was a Nymphe-class composite screw sloop and the twenty-seventh ship of the Royal Navy to bear the name. Developed and constructed for the Royal Navy on a design by William Henry White, Director of Naval Construction, she was launched at Sheerness Dockyard on 27 October 1885.

== Service history ==
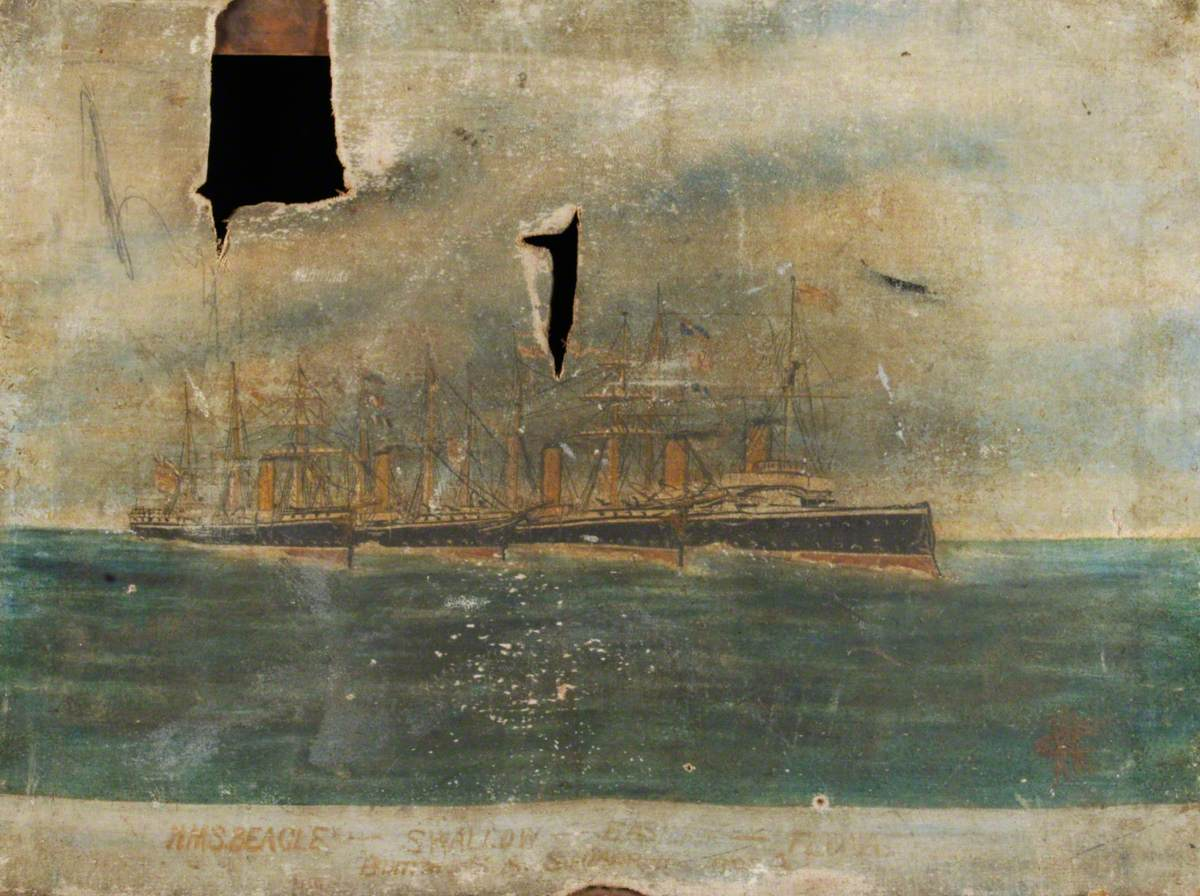
HMS Beagle, Swallow, Basilisk and Flora, unknown artist

On 17 November 1886, Swallow ran aground off Yarmouth, Isle of Wight. She was refloated and taken in to Plymouth, Devon, where she arrived on 20 November. She was engaged in East Africa in the expedition against Fumo Amari, who was the Sultan of Wituland (in modern-day Kenya). The expedition resulted in the capture of Pumwani and Jongeni, between 7 and 13 August 1893. The Ashantee Medal was awarded to those who were employed on her together with the clasp "Witu 1893".

Swallow was commissioned by commander Edward Fitzmaurice Inglefield in 1899 to serve on the South America Station. She was in Montevideo in late February 1900, and visited the Falkland Islands the following month.

== Fate ==
Swallow was sold to McCausland & Sons in 1904.
