= William Pakenham (Royal Navy officer) =

Royal Navy Admiral (1861–1933)

Admiral Sir William Pakenham GCB KCMG KCVO
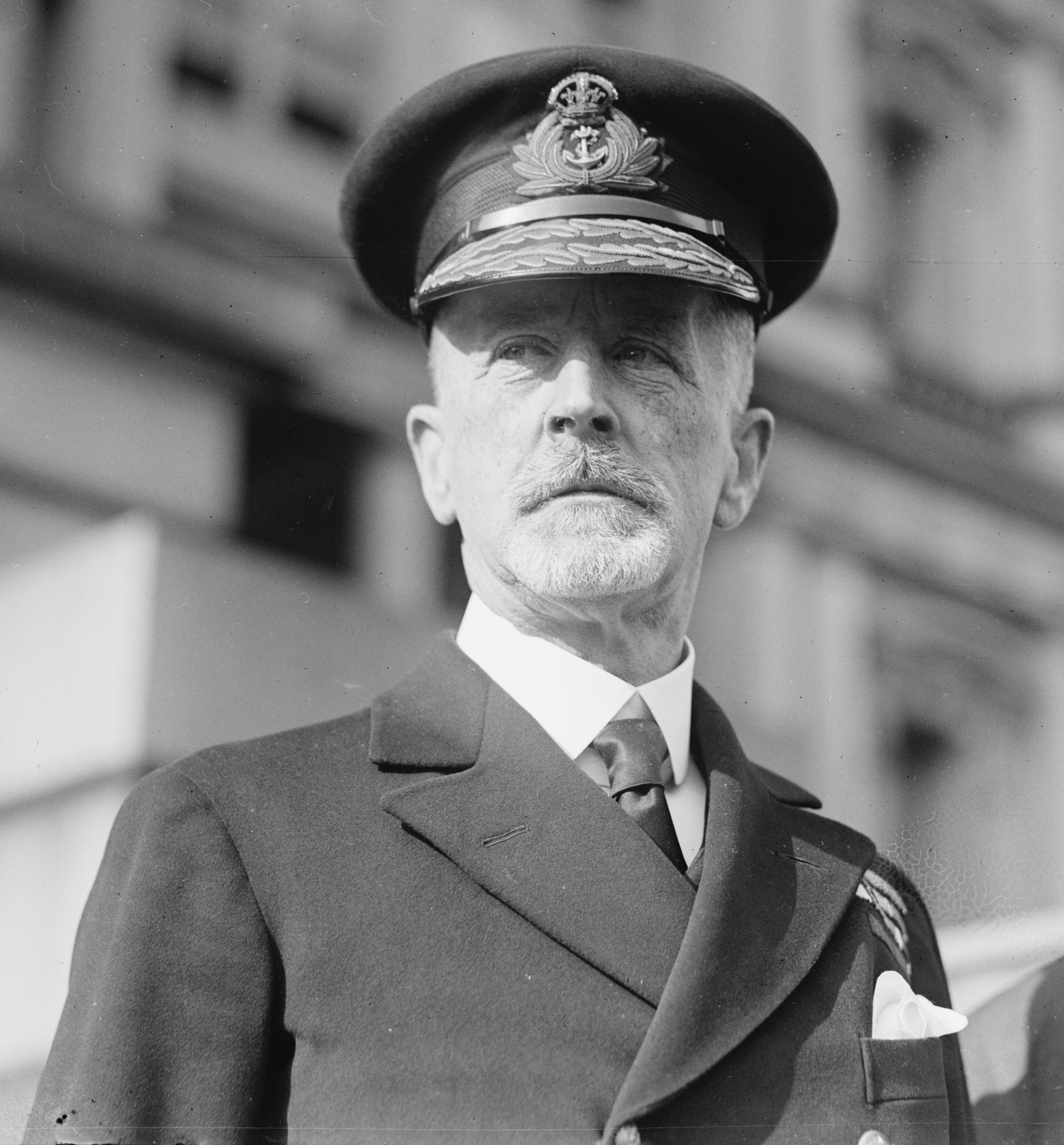
- Captain William Pakenham in 1920
- Born: 10 July 1861
- Died: 28 July 1933 (aged 72); San Sebastian, Spain
- Military career
- Allegiance: United Kingdom
- Branch: Royal Navy
- Service years: 1874–1926
- Rank: Admiral
- Commands: North America and West Indies Station (1920–23); Royal Naval College, Greenwich (1919–20); Battle Cruiser Force (1917–19); HM Australian Fleet (1916–17); 2nd Battlecruiser Squadron (1915–16); 3rd Cruiser Squadron (1913–15); HMS Collingwood (1910–11); HMS Triumph (1909); HMS Glory (1908–09); HMS Antrim (1906–08); HMS Barham (1902); HMS Daphne (1901–02)
- Conflicts: First World War
- Awards: Knight Grand Cross of the Order of the Bath; Knight Commander of the Order of St Michael and St George; Knight Commander of the Royal Victorian Order; Grand Cordon of the Order of the Rising Sun (Japan); Knight Grand Cordon of the Order of Saint Stanislaus (Russia); Legion of Honour (France); Distinguished Service Medal (United States)

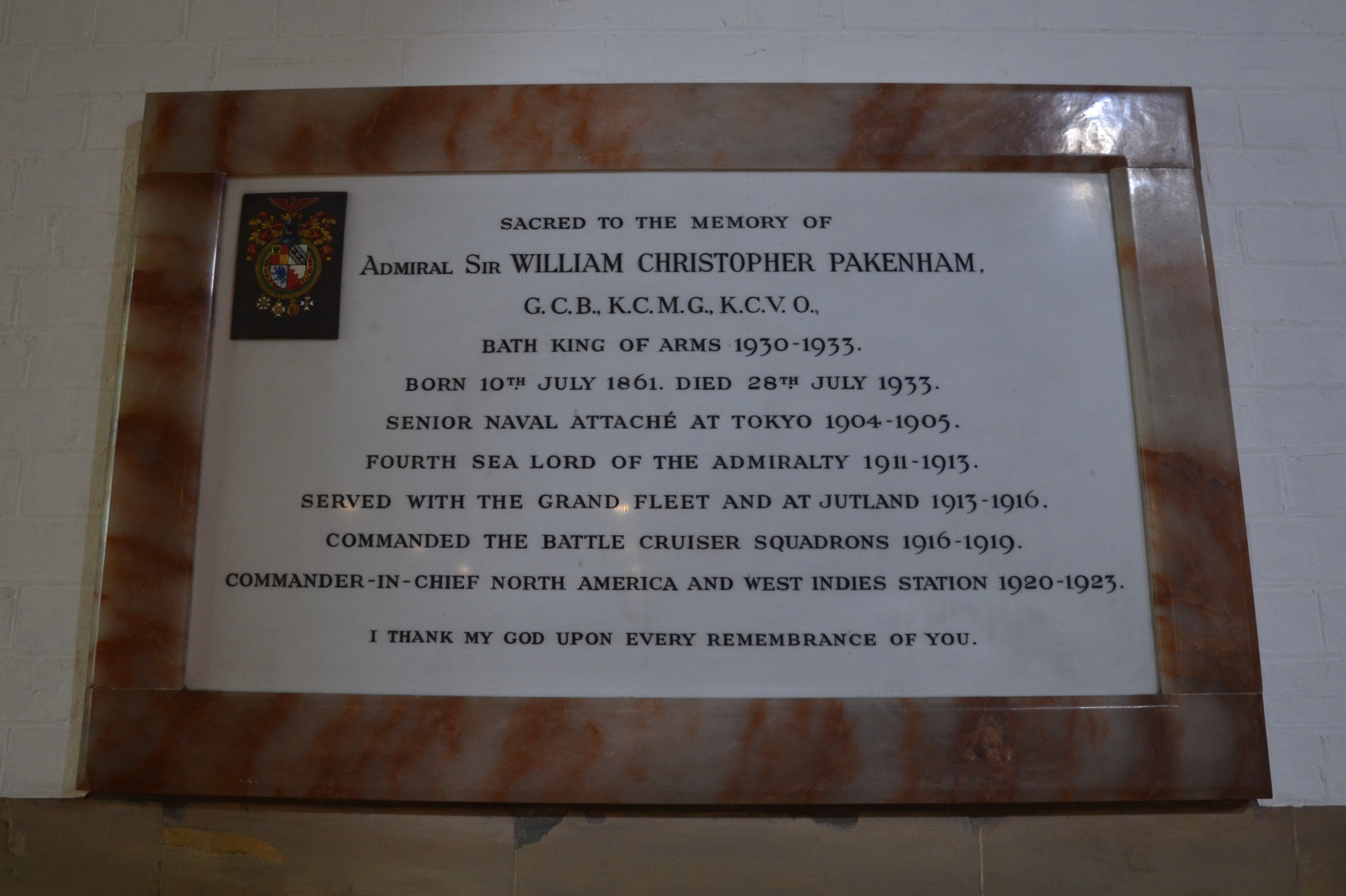
Monument to Pakenham in St Wilfrid's Church, Haywards Heath, West Sussex

Admiral Sir William Christopher Pakenham, GCB, KCMG, KCVO (10 July 1861 – 28 July 1933) was a senior Royal Navy officer. He served as a British observer with the Imperial Japanese Navy during the Russo-Japanese War; during the First World War he commanded the 2nd Battle Cruiser Squadron at the Battle of Jutland, and from December 1916 was Commander-in-Chief of the Battle Cruiser Fleet.

== Background ==
A member of the Pakenham family headed by the Earl of Longford, he was the second son of Rear-Admiral the Honourable Thomas Alexander Pakenham, third son of Thomas Pakenham, 2nd Earl of Longford. His mother was Sophia Frances Sykes, daughter of Sir Tatton Sykes, 4th Baronet.

== Career ==
Pakenham entered the navy as a naval cadet in 1874 and served upon the training ship HMS Britannia.

On completion of his training he was assigned to the Mediterranean Squadron, where he served on HMS Monarch. He was promoted to midshipman in 1876. Noted for his swimming ability, Pakenham was commended for gallantry after jumping into the sea and rescuing a coxswain who had fallen overboard at Larnaca, Cyprus, in August 1878 and some years later endeavoured to save a man who fell overboard from HMS Calypso at Kiel, Germany. Promoted to sub lieutenant in October 1880, he was transferred to HMS Canada in April 1883 and was promoted to lieutenant in October 1883. In June 1896, he was promoted to commander and took up a post with the Naval Intelligence Department from August 1899 to March 1901.

He was appointed to command HMS Daphne in March 1901, and transferred to the cruiser HMS Barham in July 1902. Barham served on the Mediterranean Fleet until October 1902, when she returned home to be paid off on 6 December 1902. Pakenham subsequently served on the China Station when he was promoted to captain on 30 June 1903 before he became a Naval Attaché at Tokyo from April 1904 to May 1906. During his stay in Japan, he was one of several military observers as part of the Anglo-Japanese Alliance, who provided military intelligence and military advice to their Japanese counterparts.

During the early stages of the Russo-Japanese War of 1904–1905, he was attached to the Japanese First Fleet, where he developed ties with Japanese admiral Tōgō Heihachirō. However, despite these ties, he was reportedly hesitant to set foot on shore, for fear that the Japanese fleet would sail without him. He was eventually assigned to the battleship Asahi, where he spent 14 months, and was an observer at the Battle of Tsushima aboard the on 27 May 1905. During this battle, he narrowly missed being hit by fragments of a Russian shell, which killed crewmen standing nearby. Drenched with blood, Pakenham returned to his cabin and changed into a new dress white uniform, and returned to his observation post a few minutes later. His detailed reports on the battle strongly supported the Royal Navy's trend towards the adoption of an all big-gun fast battleship fleet. Pakenham's reports to London were strongly pro-Japanese and the British historian Geoffrey Jukes observed his "...reporting tended to depict Russia as his enemy, not just Japan's".

He was appointed a Companion of the Order of the Bath on 24 July 1905, and on 18 April 1906 he was awarded the Order of the Rising Sun (Second Class) by the Emperor of Japan.

While commanding HMS Antrim, escorting King Edward VII to Ireland in July 1907, he was awarded the Member of the Royal Victorian Order.

He acted as Fourth Sea Lord and a Lord Commissioner of the Admiralty between 9 December 1911 and December 1913, additionally serving as Naval Aide-de-Camp to King George V between 1912 and 1913. In 1913, he was promoted to rear admiral, and in December was appointed to command the 3rd Cruiser Squadron.

During the First World War, Pakenham was given command of the 2nd Battlecruiser Squadron on 7 March 1915, and raised his flag aboard the battlecruiser HMAS Australia. After Australia was taken out of service following a collision, he transferred his flag to HMS New Zealand: aboard this battlecruiser, he participated in the Battle of Jutland, and was awarded the Knight Commander of the Order of the Bath on 31 May 1916 for his actions. Pakenham was appointed Rear Admiral Commanding HM Australian Fleet in September 1916. After Admiral Sir David Beatty was given the command of the Grand Fleet in succession to Admiral Sir John Jellicoe in November 1916, he assumed command of the Battle Cruiser Force on 19 June 1917, and was promoted to Acting Vice Admiral. During the visit of King George V to the Fleet in July 1917, Pakenham was made a Knight Commander of the Royal Victorian Order (KCVO). He was also awarded the Order of St. Stanislaus (Second Class) and was given a gift from the Emperor Taishō of Japan.

After the end of the First World War, Pakenham briefly served as the President of the Royal Naval College, Greenwich from 1919 to 1920 and then as Commander-in-Chief on the North America and West Indies Station from October 1920 with HMS Raleigh as his flagship. His visit to the west coast of the United States in 1922 was a diplomatic success, and he was appointed admiral in that year; however, Raleigh ran aground in fog off the coast of Labrador and was a loss. Pakenham was awarded the Knight Grand Cross of the Order of the Bath in the 1925 Birthday Honours, and was appointed Bath King of Arms on 7 February 1930. Pakenham retired from active duty in 1926. He died unmarried, at San Sebastian, Spain, on 28 July 1933.

== Notes ==
Military offices
Preceded by Sir Charles Madden	Fourth Sea Lord; 1911–1913	Succeeded by Sir Cecil Lambert
Preceded by George Patey	Rear Admiral Commanding HM Australian Fleet; 1916–1917	Succeeded by Arthur Leveson
Preceded by Sir Henry Jackson	President, Royal Naval College, Greenwich; 1919–1920	Succeeded by Sir Frederick Tudor
Preceded by Sir Trevylyan Napier	Commander-in-Chief, North America and West Indies Station; 1920–1923	Succeeded by Sir Michael Culme-Seymour
Heraldic offices
Preceded by Sir Charles Monro	King of Arms of the Order of the Bath; 1930–1933	Succeeded by Sir Walter Braithwaite
