= Nymphe-class sloop =

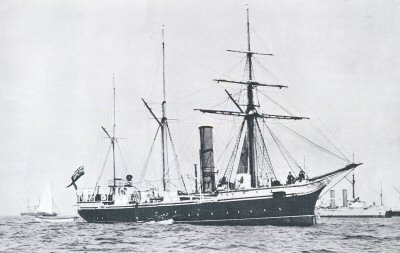
- HMS Nymphe, name ship of the Nymphe class

Class overview
- Name: Nymphe class
- Operators: Royal Navy
- Preceded by: Satellite class
- Succeeded by: Beagle class
- Built: 1885–1888
- In commission: 1885–1921
- Completed: 4

General characteristics
- Type: Screw composite sloop
- Displacement: 1140 tons
- Length: 195 ft (59 m) pp
- Beam: 28 ft (8.5 m)
- Draught: 12 ft 6 in (3.81 m)
- Installed power: Swallow, Daphne: 1,570 ihp (1,170 kW); Buzzard, Nymphe: 2,000 ihp (1,500 kW)
- Propulsion: Horizontal triple-expansion steam engine; Twin screws
- Sail plan: Barquentine rigged
- Speed: Swallow, Daphne: 13.5 kn (25.0 km/h; 15.5 mph); Buzzard, Nymphe: 14.5 kn (26.9 km/h; 16.7 mph)
- Range: 3,000 nmi (5,600 km; 3,500 mi) at 10 kn (19 km/h; 12 mph)
- Armament: 8 × BL 5-inch (127.0 mm) guns; 4 × 1-inch Nordenfeldt machine guns; 4 × .45-inch Gardner machine guns

The Nymphe class was a class of four screw composite sloops built for the Royal Navy between 1885 and 1888. As built they were armed with four 4-inch guns and four 3-pounder guns.

== Design ==
Built to a design by William Henry White, Director of Naval Construction, Nymphe and her sister ships were constructed of an iron frame sheathed with teak and copper (hence 'composite'), and powered by both sails and a steam engine delivering 1,570 to 2,000 indicated horsepower (1,170 to 1,490 kW) through twin screws.

== Employment ==
Although made obsolete by quickly changing naval technology, these sloops were ideal for operations in the far distant outposts of the British Empire in the late 19th century. Swallow served on the South Atlantic Station, Buzzard on the North America and West Indies Station and Nymphe on the Pacific Station. Daphne served on the China Station, and it was in June 1900 that she brought ammunition into Shanghai during the Boxer Rebellion. Nymphe and Buzzard survived until after World War I as harbour training ships.

== Ships ==
| Name | Ship Builder | Launched | Fate |
|---|---|---|---|
| Nymphe | Portsmouth Dockyard | 1 May 1888 | Shore training ship at Sheerness from Aug 1914, later renamed Wildfire and sold in 1920 |
| Buzzard | Sheerness Dockyard | 10 May 1887 | Renamed President on 1 April 1911 and sold on 6 September 1921 |
| Daphne | Sheerness Dockyard | 29 May 1888 | Sold 1904 |
| Swallow | Sheerness Dockyard | 27 October 1885 | Sold 1904 |

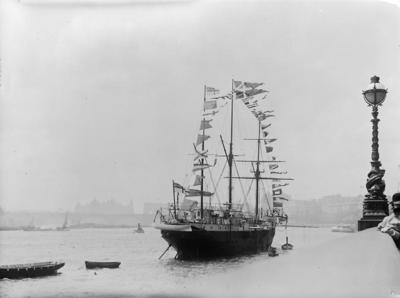
Buzzard at Blackfriars, London in June 1907 as a Royal Naval Volunteer Reserve training ship
