= Basilisk (disambiguation) =

A basilisk is a legendary reptile reputed to be king of serpents.

Basilisk may also refer to:

== Biology ==
- Common basilisk, a lizard found in Central and South American rainforests
- Any lizard of the genus Basiliscus
- Prangos ferulacea (Common basilisk), a Mediterranean plant

== Arts and entertainment ==
- Basilisk (The Legendary Pink Dots album), 1982
- Basilisk (D'erlanger album), 1990

=== Fictional uses ===
- Basilisk (comics), the name of four Marvel Comics characters
- Basilisk, a fictional terrorist group seen in the DC Comics Suicide Squad
- Basilisk (Harry Potter)
- Basilisk (manga), a manga and anime series
- A motif in the works of author David Langford
- A star system in the David Weber novel On Basilisk Station
- Roko's basilisk, a thought experiment originating on the LessWrong blog

== Military ==
- Basilisk (cannon)
- HMAS Basilisk, a naval base
- HMS Basilisk, the name of several Royal Navy ships

== Other ==
- Basilisk (web browser), a fork of Firefox that maintains support for XUL/XPCOM extensions and retains the user interface of the Firefox 29-56 era
- Basilisk, Queensland, a locality in the Cassowary Coast Region, Queensland, Australia
- Basilisk II, a software emulator

== See also ==
- Basiliscus, Roman emperor (475–476)
