= HMS Basilisk =

Ten ships of the Royal Navy have borne the name HMS Basilisk, after the Basilisk, a mythical lizard:

- HMS Basilisk (1695) was a 4-gun bomb vessel launched in 1695 and broken up in 1729.
- HMS Basilisk (1740) was a 4-gun bomb vessel launched in 1740 and sold in 1750.
- HMS Basilisk (1759) was an 8-gun bomb vessel launched in 1759 and captured in 1762 by the French privateer Audacieux.
- HMS Basilisk was a fireship, previously the 14-gun sloop HMS Grasshopper. She was renamed HMS Basilisk in 1779 and was sold in 1783.
- HMS Basilisk (1801) was a 12-gun Bloodhound-class gun-brig launched in 1801 and sold in 1815.
- HMS Basilisk (1822) was a 6-gun cutter launched in 1822 and sold in 1846.
- HMS Basilisk (1848) was a wood paddle sloop launched in 1848 and broken up in 1882.
- HMS Basilisk (1889) was a Beagle-class steel screw sloop launched in 1889. She became a coal hulk and was renamed C 7, finally being sold into civilian service in 1905.
- HMS Basilisk (1910) was a Beagle-class destroyer launched in 1910 and sold in 1921.
- HMS Basilisk (H11) was a B-class destroyer launched in 1930 and sunk in 1940.
