= HMS Acorn =

Six ships of the Royal Navy have borne the name HMS Acorn. A seventh was planned but never completed:

- HMS Acorn (1649) was a 22-gun ship hired between 1649 and 1654.
- HMS Acorn (1807) was an 18-gun Cormorant-class ship-sloop launched in 1807 and broken up in 1819.
- HMS Acorn (1826) was an 18-gun sloop launched in 1826 and wrecked in 1828.
- HMS Acorn was to have been an 18-gun sloop, but the order was cancelled in 1831.
- HMS Acorn (1838) was a 12-gun brig launched in 1838. She was used as a coal hulk from 1861 and was sold in 1869.
- HMS Acorn (1884) was a Mariner-class composite screw sloop launched in 1884 and sold in 1899.
- HMS Acorn (1910) was an Acorn-class destroyer launched on 1 July 1910 and sold in 1921.
