= HMS Satellite (1855) =

British corvette

History

United Kingdom
- Name: HMS Satellite
- Launched: 26 September 1855
- Out of service: 1870
- Fate: Broken up in 1879

General characteristics
- Class & type: Pearl-class corvette
- Tonnage: 1461 tons
- Length: 200 feet
- Propulsion: Screw
- Armament: 21

HMS Satellite was a wooden screw corvette launched on 26 September 1855 at Devonport for the Royal Navy. In 1856–1861 she served in the Pacific and in 1861–1865 she served off the south east coast of North America.. On 13 June 1860, she ran aground on a reef in the Pacific Ocean. Repairs cost £555. Between 1866 and 1870 she served on the China station, sailing home with the Flying Squadron. She was broken up at Devonport in 1879.

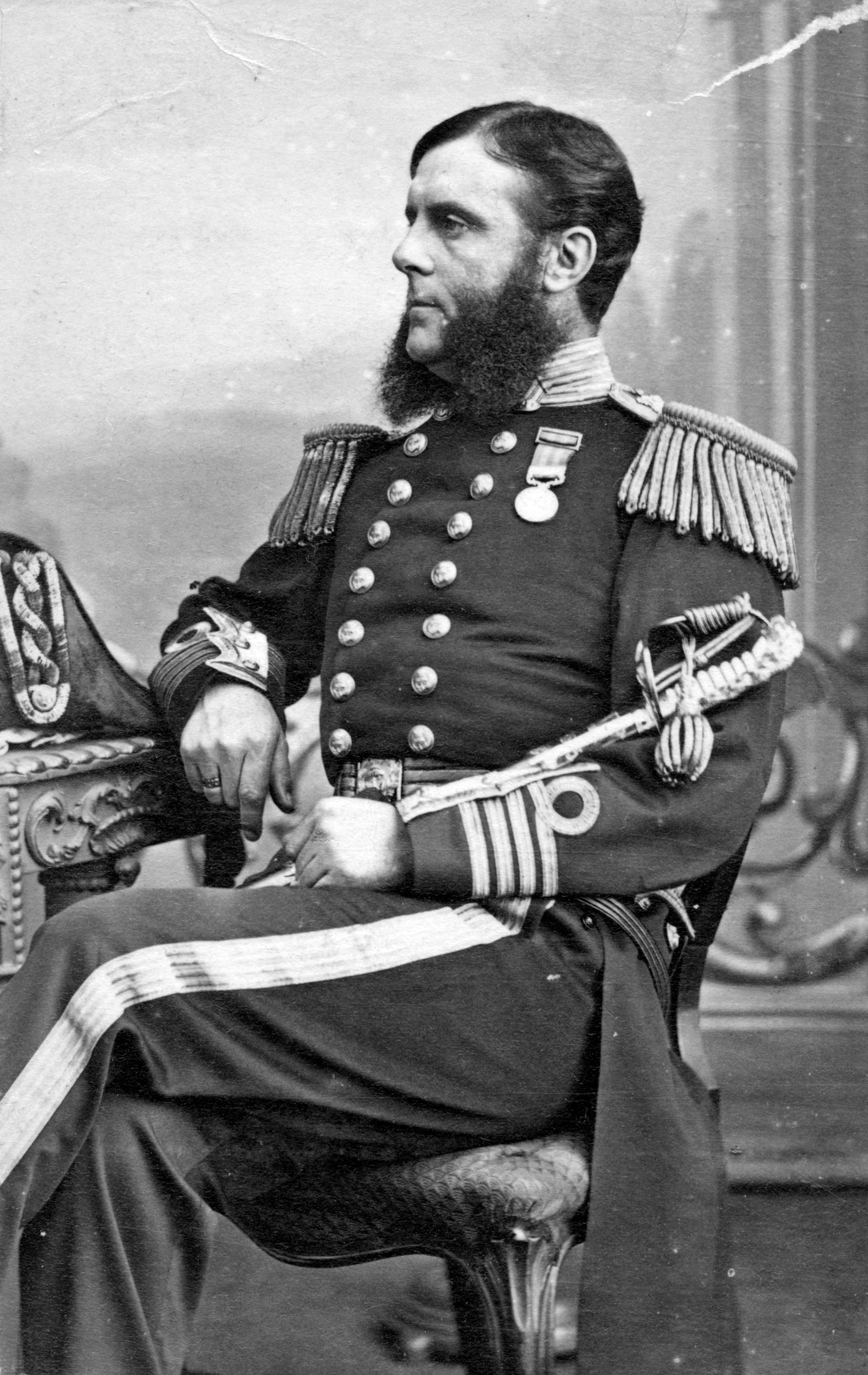
Captain Edye of HMS Satellite, circa 1860s
