= HMS President (shore establishment) =

British onshore naval establishment

Coordinates: 51.5053°N 0.0711°W

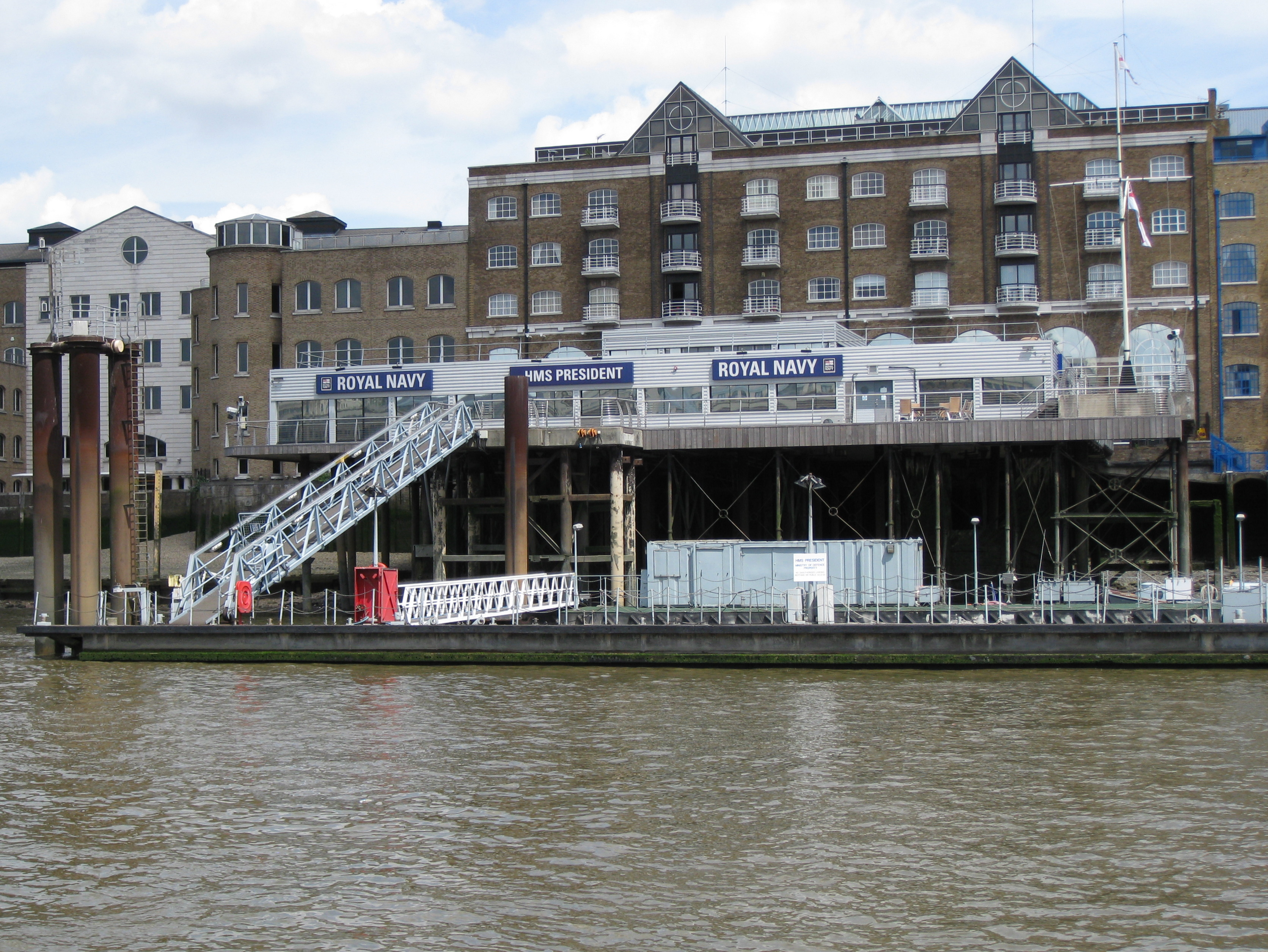

History

United Kingdom
- Name: HMS President
- Commissioned: 10 November 1903
- Status: Currently operational
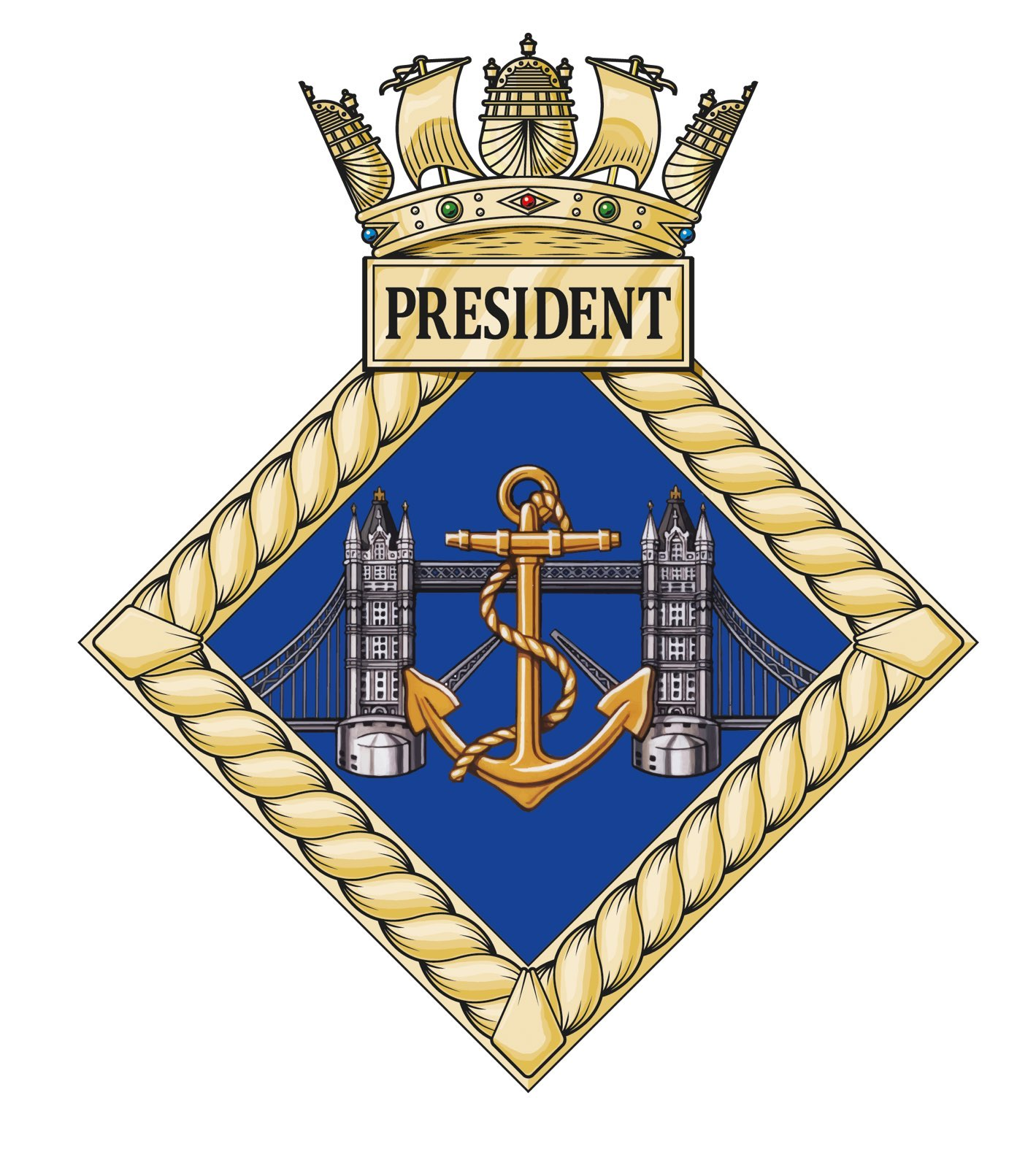
- Badge

General characteristics
- Class & type: Stone frigate

HMS President is a "stone frigate", or shore establishment of the Royal Naval Reserve, based on the northern bank of the River Thames near Tower Bridge in Wapping and is in the London Borough of Tower Hamlets.

== Present day ==
The division consists of over 300 officers and ratings, making it the largest in the country. The division draws recruits from the city, as well as further afield. There is also a satellite unit in Chatham, the Medway Division.

== History ==
There had been a drill ship moored in London since 1 April 1862. This was the 58-gun frigate HMS President, berthed at the West India Docks and training ship of the local Royal Naval Reserve. They were joined in 1872 by the Royal Naval Artillery Volunteers. This ship was named Old President on 25 March 1903, and was sold for scrapping on 7 July 1903.

This ship had been constructed in 1829 on the exact lines of the American 'monster frigate' USS President which was captured by the Royal Navy at the close of the War of 1812, and the name was deliberately retained in memory both of this capture, and also the 1806 capture of the French frigate Président which had served as HMS President from 1806 to 1815.

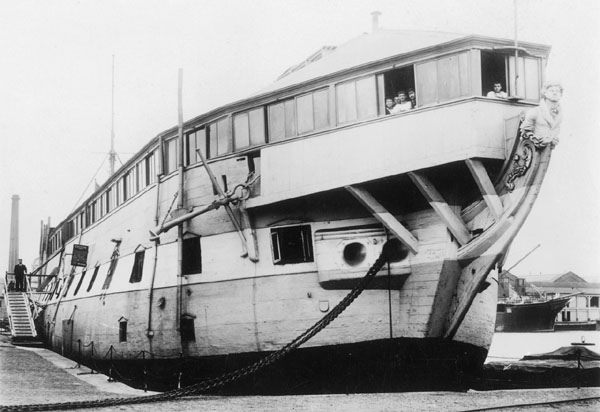
The frigate HMS President, launched in 1829, was the RNR's London Division drill ship from 1862 to July 1903.

All the Old President's successors in the London RNR role have also been renamed HMS President, including HMS Gannet, HMS Buzzard, the Flower-class sloop HMS Saxifrage, and the present shore training establishment in St Katharine Docks.

With the passing of the Naval Forces Act by Parliament on 30 June 1903, the Royal Naval Volunteer Reserve was created. The London Division was established on 10 November 1903 and held its first drill night at the Fishmongers' Hall. It then moved to the Doterel-class sloop-of-war HMS Gannet then moored in the Thames. The Gannet had been renamed HMS President on 16 May 1903. She served for nine years as the centre's home, until being paid off on 31 March 1911, and is now preserved in Chatham Historic Dockyard. She was replaced by HMS Buzzard, which had been serving as a training ship at Blackfriars since 19 May 1904. She took the name HMS President on 1 April 1911. This President served until 23 January 1918, when she was lent to The Marine Society, finally being sold on 6 September 1921.

It was intended to replace her with the Anchusa-class sloop HMS Marjoram, but she was wrecked on her way to being fitted out. She was instead replaced by her sister HMS Saxifrage, which was renamed HMS President on 9 September 1921. She was moored at King's Reach on 19 June 1922. She was joined in 1938 by HMS Chrysanthemum, which served as a drill hall and gave extra space for activities. HMS President was taken over in 1939 for the training of DEMS gunners and sailors. The Reserve division had been closed by April 1940. The division was reformed in October 1946 and continued to serve as the London base.

== Later history ==
President took a number of roles and duties, one of which was to serve as the accounting base for Admiralty personnel. The Royal Navy section was transferred to a new section named HMS St Vincent on 15 September 1983. St Vincent was located in a building that had been purchased in 1954 as accommodation for WRNS. It was commissioned as an independent command in 1985 and was paid off on 31 March 1992. In the mid-1980s the River-class minesweeper HMS Humber was attached to the base. In 1988 both HMS President and HMS Chrysanthemum were sold and the division moved ashore, into a purpose-built training centre next to Tower Bridge overlooking St Katharine Docks. This had formerly been the site of the P&O London ferry terminal. HMS Humber was transferred away from the base in 1994. In 2005, the site was chosen for the unveiling of Daniel Craig as the new Bond franchise actor.

=== Locations ===
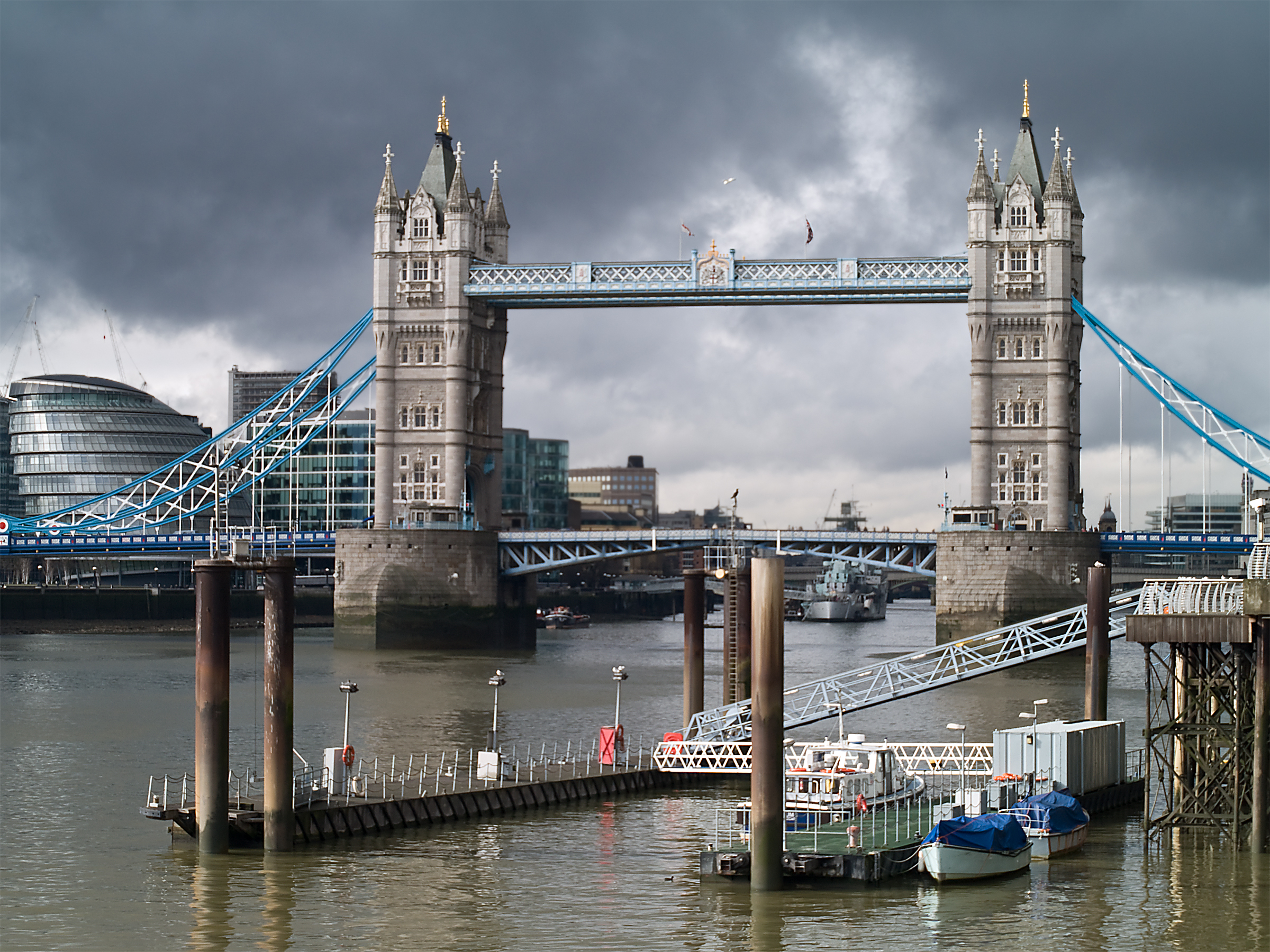
The pier of HMS President at St Katharine's Way. In the background, Tower Bridge.

HMS President has also sited some departments at a number of different locations onshore in the city of London. These have included:

- Royal Victoria Yard, Deptford (1918 – 21 April 1958)
- PLA building (November 1946 – 1973)
- Furze House (21 April 1958 – 1976)
- Thomas More Street (1970s)
- E. Smithfield (1978–1979)
- Lavington Street (1979–1982)
- St Katharine's Way (1 February 1988 – present)

There was also a branch, HMS Co President, established at Shrewsbury between 1944 and 1947.

== Subdivisions ==
As the unit developed, new departments were established and spun off, often taking up residency in buildings across the city. They retained the name President, but adopting a specific identifying numeral after it. They were:

=== HMS President I ===
Located both in London and Shrewsbury it was established as an accounting base, in operation between 1918 and 1928. It took over the accounting from the Stornoway based HMS Iolaire, which had closed on 19 May 1919. It was at the Royal Victoria Yard in 1939, and moved to Shrewsbury in September 1940. It returned to London on 6 July 1945, setting up operations at Chelsea Court. It took over some Naval Party accounts from HMS Odyssey when that office closed on 31 January 1946. The department remained operational between 1947 and 1957, seeing the merging into it of HMS President III and HMS Pembroke III.

=== HMS President II ===
This was another accounting base, based at times at Chatham, Crystal Palace, Chingford and Shrewsbury, and extant between 1916 and at least 1947. Also at Felixstowe in 1917. (Possibly also at Calshot and Bembridge during 1917.)

=== HMS President III ===
A third accounting base, this time alternately based at Bristol, Windsor and London. It covered the accounts of the active services of the Royal Fleet Reserve, the Royal Naval Volunteer Reserve and the Royal Naval Reserve from 1916 onwards, also extending to covering demobilisation accounts from December 1918 onwards. The Defensively Equipped Merchant Ship accounts were transferred to HMS Vivid on 1 October 1919. In August 1935, President III also took over the accounts of the Mobile Naval Defence Base Organisation.

It was re-established on 28 August 1939 in Bristol to train those allocated for service on the Defensively Equipped Merchant Ships. It was later transferred to locations across Windsor and London. By 31 May 1944 the command held over 30,500 accounts. The ledgers were closed after the war on 1 July 1946, and the accounts covered by President III and Pembroke III were merged into President I.

=== HMS President IV ===
This was the London accounting base, in operation between 1918 and 1926, handling the accounts of the commands of the Coastguard ships and the Reserves.

=== HMS President V ===
Another London accounting base, initially set up in 1918 it covered a wide variety of accounts but was paid off on 30 September 1919 and the accounts were transferred to HMS Pembroke. It was recommissioned on 1 November 1941 as a training establishment for Accountant Branch Ratings. It closed on 14 July 1944 and its operations were moved to HMS Demetrius.

=== HMS President VI ===
Also established in 1918, it handled transport service accounts, and from February 1919 was the base for the Murmansk tugs, whilst handling the accounts of officers assigned to Northern Russia. These accounts were transferred to HMS Lobster in July 1919.
