= RML 40-pounder gun =

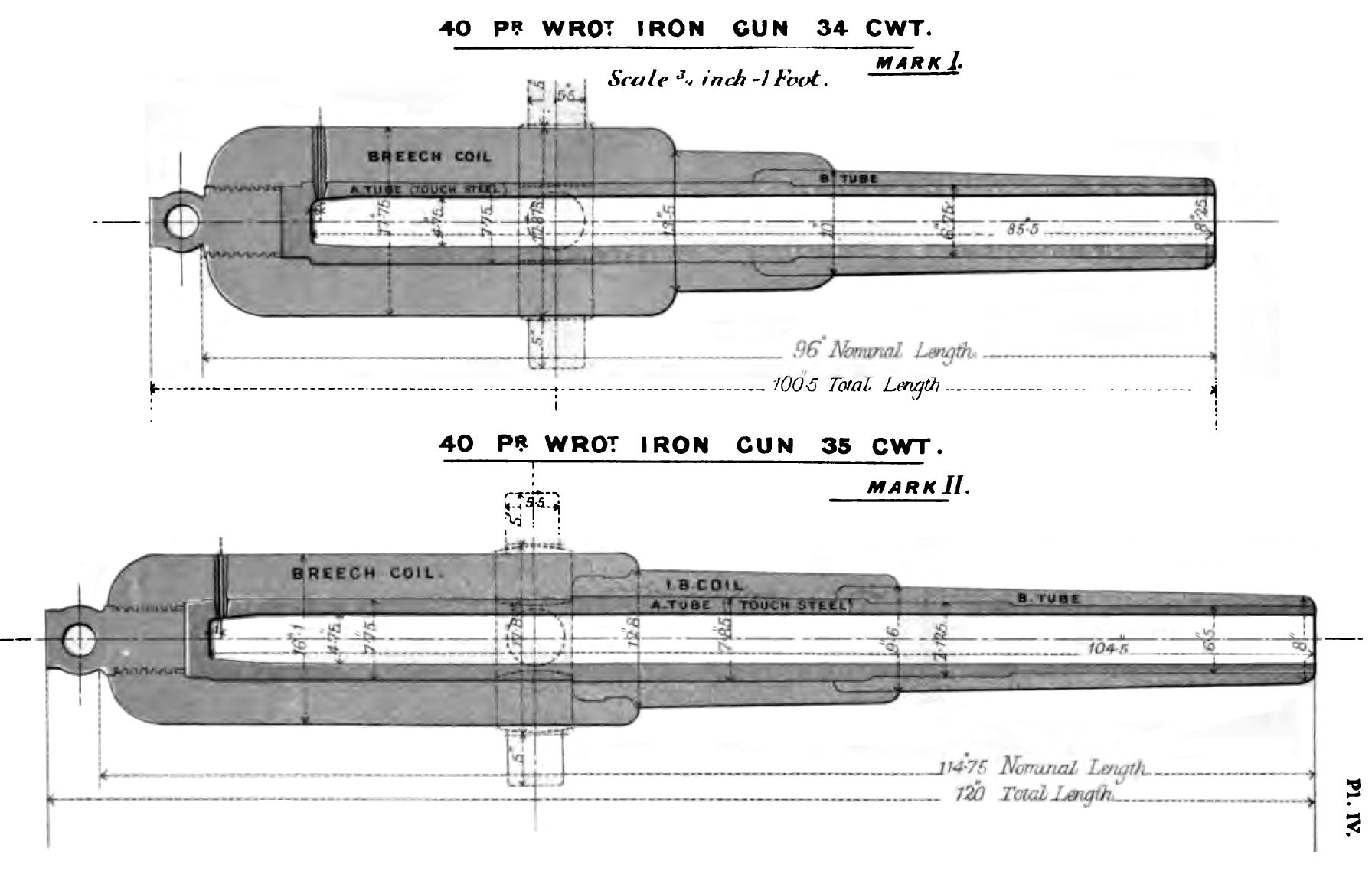
- Short Mk I barrel and lengthened Mk II barrel
- Type: Heavy field gun Fortification gun
- Place of origin: United Kingdom

Service history
- Used by: British Empire

Production history
- Designed: Mk I : 1871; Mk II : 1874

Specifications
- Mass: Mk I (34cwt) : 3,808 pounds (1,727 kg); Mk II (35cwt) : 3,920 pounds (1,780 kg)
- Barrel length: Mk I : 85.5 inches (2,170 mm) bore (18 calibres); Mk II : 104.5 inches (2,650 mm) bore (22 calibres)
- Shell: 40 pounds 2 ounces (18.20 kg)
- Calibre: 4.75 inches (121 mm)
- Action: RML
- Muzzle velocity: Mk II : 1,425 feet per second (434 m/s)

The RML 40-pounder gun was a British rifled muzzle-loading siege and fortification gun designed in 1871. It was intended to supersede the RBL 40-pounder Armstrong gun after the British military reverted to rifled muzzle-loading artillery until a more satisfactory breech-loading system than that of the Armstrong guns was developed.

== Description ==
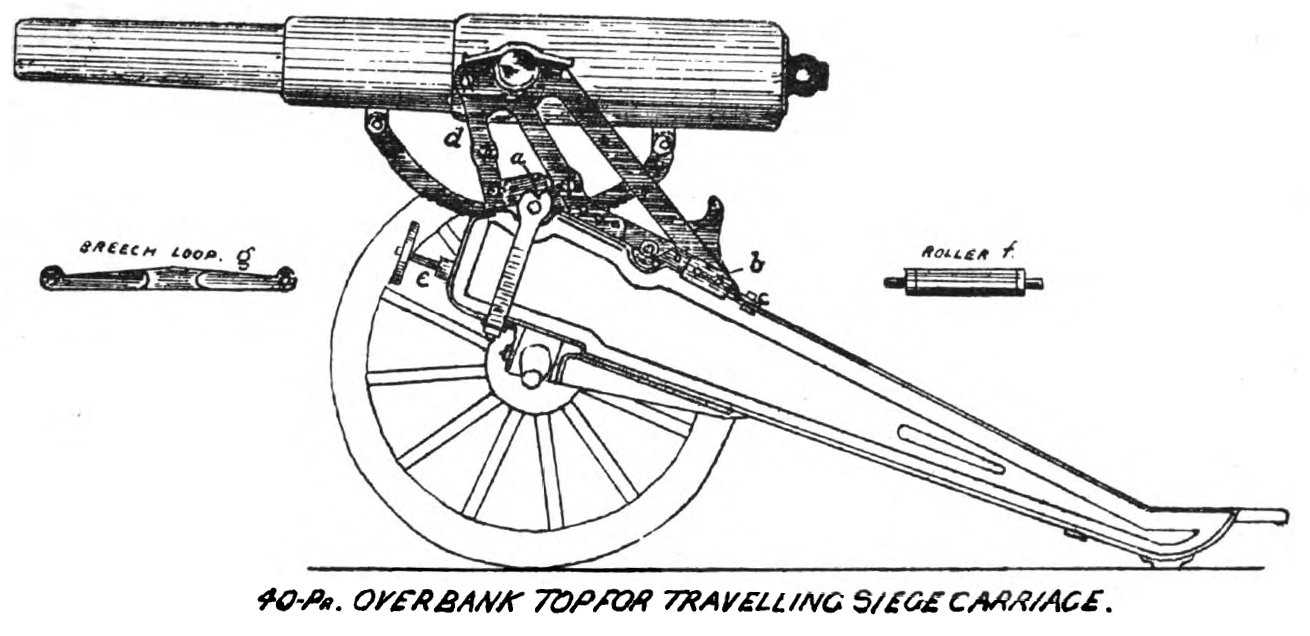
40-pounder gun on overbank carriage for use in fortifications

The original Mk I short barrel of 18 calibres suffered from irregular velocity and hence accuracy, due to incomplete burning of the powder charge, hence only 20 were built.

The Mark II of 1874 with barrel lengthened to 22 calibres solved this problem and became the definitive model.

The gun consisted of a central toughened steel "A" tube surrounded by wrought-iron coils, with a trunnion ring and cascabel. Rifling was the "Woolwich" pattern of three broad grooves, with a uniform twist of 1 turn in 35 calibres (i.e. in 166.25 inches).

== Service use ==
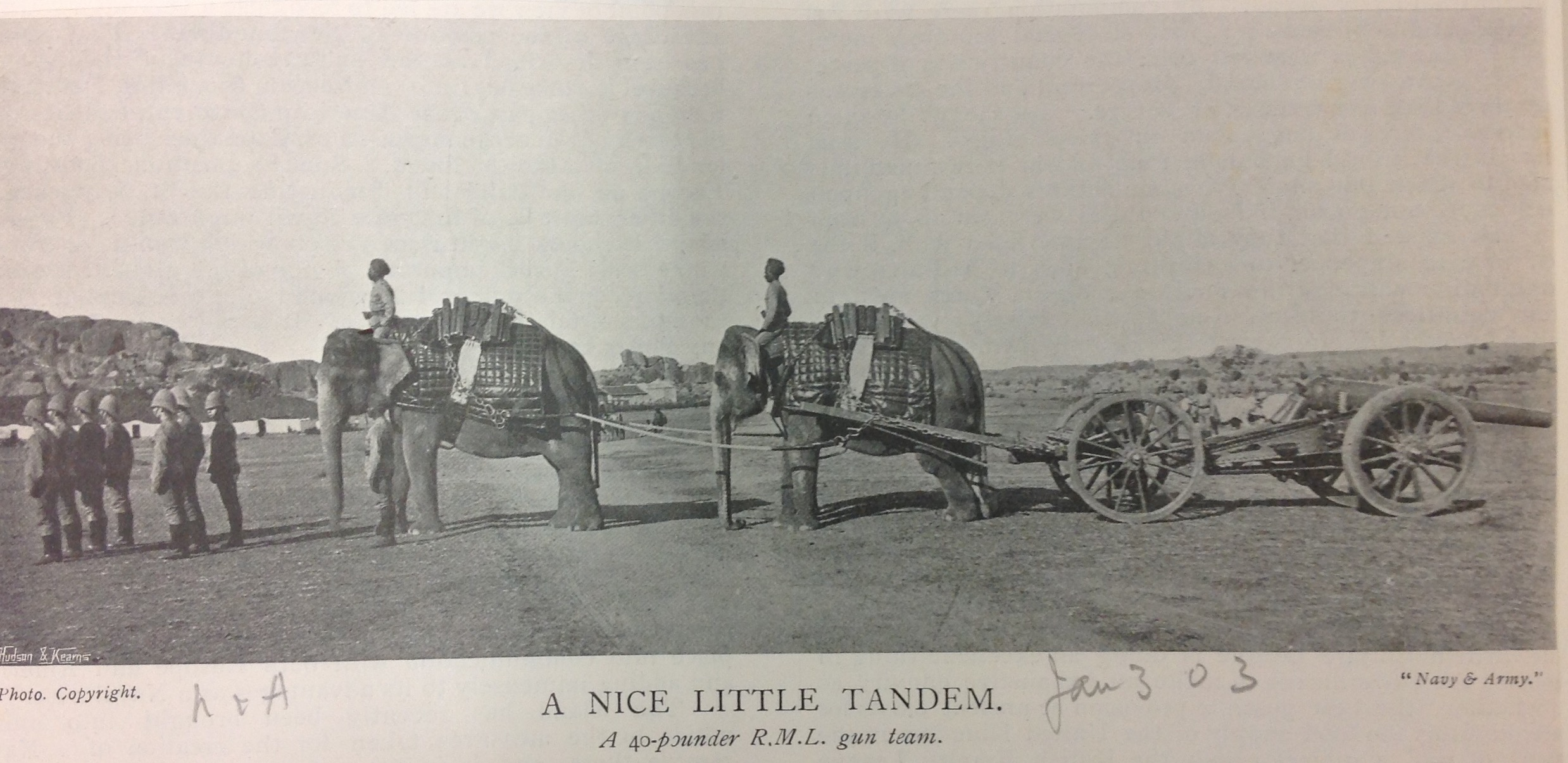
40-pounder RML as part of a Royal Artillery Elephant Battery, India, 1900

Four 40-pounders were used during the defence of Kandahar, during the 2nd Anglo-Afghan War in 1880. Ten 40-pounder RML guns were landed in Egypt in 1882 as part of a Royal Artillery Siege train formed for the Anglo-Egyptian War, however none of them were deployed in action.

The guns were also deployed at Forts and Batteries around Great Britain to form part of the fixed defences. In some cases special overbank carriages were issued for this use. They remained in this role until 1902, by which time most had been dismounted and scrapped.

== Bibliography ==
- Treatise on the Construction and Manufacture of Ordnance in the British Service. War Office, UK, 1877
- Text Book of Gunnery, 1887. LONDON : PRINTED FOR HIS MAJESTY'S STATIONERY OFFICE, BY HARRISON AND SONS, ST. MARTIN'S LANE
