= HMS Magpie =

Nine ships of the Royal Navy have been named HMS Magpie, after the bird, the magpie:

- The first HMS Magpie (1806) was a 4-gun schooner launched in 1806 and captured by the French in 1807.
- The second HMS Magpie (1826) was launched at Jamaica in 1826 as the name vessel of her class. She was lost off Cuba two months after her launch.
- The third HMS Magpie (1830) was a 4-gun cutter launched in 1830, used for dockyard service after 1845, being renamed YC6. She was in service until at least 1880, and was possibly sold in 1908.
- The fourth HMS Magpie (1855) was a Dapper-class screw gunboat launched in 1855 and wrecked in 1864.
- The fifth HMS Magpie (1868) was a Plover-class screw gunboat launched in 1868, used as a survey vessel after 1878, and sold in 1885.
- The sixth HMS Magpie (1889) was a Redbreast-class screw gunboat launched in 1889. She was used as a boom defence vessel from 1902, reverting to a gunboat in 1915, before being transferred for use as a depot ship later that year. She was sold in 1921.
- The seventh HMS Magpie (U82), later F82, was a Modified Black Swan-class sloop launched in 1943 and broken up after 1959.
- The eighth HMS Magpie (1982) was the trawler Hondo purchased in 1982 and used until 1996 for target practice.
- The ninth HMS Magpie (H130) is an inshore survey vessel, commissioned on 28 June 2018.

== Battle honours ==
- Baltic 1855
- Benin 1897
- Atlantic 1943–1944
- Normandy 1944
- Arctic 1944
