= HMS Pylades =

Seven ships of the Royal Navy have been named HMS Pylades after Pylades, a character in Greek mythology:

- HMS Pylades (1781) was an 18-gun sloop, previously the Dutch privateer Hercules. She was captured in 1781 and broken up in 1790.
- HMS Pylades (1794) was a 16-gun sloop launched in 1794. She was wrecked later that year, but salvaged and sold. The Admiralty repurchased her in 1796 and sold her in 1815.
- HMS Pylades (1824) was an 18-gun sloop launched in 1824 and broken up in 1845.
- HMS Pylades (1854) was a wooden screw corvette launched in 1854 and sold in 1875.
- HMS Pylades (1884) was a Satellite-class composite screw corvette launched in 1884 and sold in 1906.
- HMS Pylades (1916) was an Admiralty M-class destroyer launched in 1916 and sold in 1921.
- HMS Pylades (J401) was a Catherine-class minesweeper launched in 1943 and sunk in 1944 during the Normandy Campaign.
