= Beagle-class sloop =

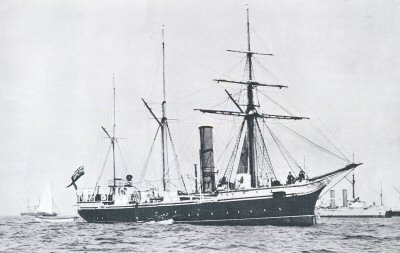
- A photograph of Nymphe, visually identical to the Beagle class

Class overview
- Name: Beagle-class sloop
- Operators: Royal Navy
- Built: 1889
- In commission: 1889–1920
- Completed: 2
- Lost: 0

General characteristics
- Type: Screw steel sloop
- Displacement: 1170 tons
- Length: 195 ft (59 m) pp
- Beam: 30 ft (9.1 m)
- Draught: 13 ft (4.0 m)
- Installed power: 2,000 ihp (1,500 kW)
- Propulsion: 3-cylinder horizontal triple-expansion steam engine; 2 screws
- Sail plan: Barquentine rig
- Speed: 14.5 kn (26.9 km/h)
- Endurance: 3,000 nmi (5,600 km) at 10 kn (19 km/h)
- Complement: 138
- Armament: As built: 8 × BL 5-inch (127.0 mm) 50-pounder guns; After 1900: 8 × quick firing 4.7-inch guns
- Armour: Protective deck of 1 to 1 1/2 in (2.5 to 3.8 cm) steel over the machinery and boilers

The Beagle class was a two-ship class of 8-gun screw steel sloops built for the Royal Navy in 1889.

== Design ==
Beagle and Basilisk were constructed of copper-sheathed steel to a design by William White, the Royal Navy Director of Naval Construction. They were powered by a twin-screw three-cylinder horizontal triple-expansion steam engine developing 2,000 indicated horsepower (1,500 kW) and carried a barquentine sail rig. They were essentially the same design as the preceding Nymphe class, but built of steel rather than of composite wood-and-steel.

== Operational use ==
In common with other designs of Royal Navy sloop of the period, the Beagle class were not intended or designed to fight a modern fleet action; they were intended to patrol Britain's extensive maritime empire, and this is how they were employed. Beagle conducted three foreign commissions between 1890 and 1900, at least two of which were on the South Atlantic Station. She was refitted in 1900, during which her 5-inch (130 mm) breech-loading guns were replaced with quick-firing guns. Basilisk also spent all or part of her career on the South Atlantic Station.

== Ships ==
Name	Ship Builder	Launched	Fate
Beagle	Portsmouth Dockyard	28 February 1889	Sold for breaking on 11 July 1905
Basilisk	Sheerness Dockyard	6 April 1889	Became coal hulk C7 and sold as Maggie Grech in 1905
