= BL 5-inch gun Mk I – V =

Ordnance BL 5-inch gun Mks I – V
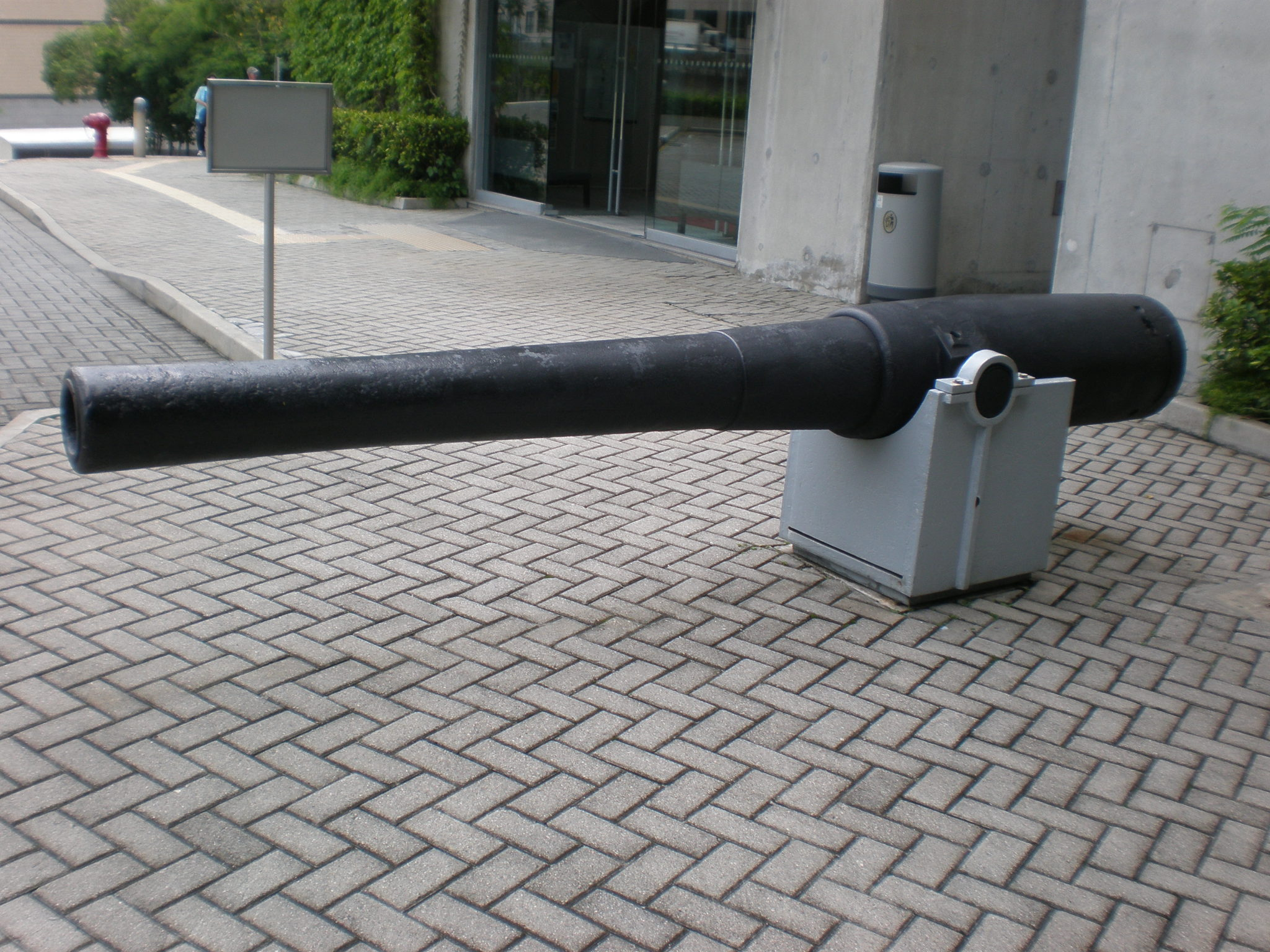
- Mk I coast defence gun outside entrance to the Hong Kong Museum of Coastal Defence
- Type: Naval gun Coast defence gun Field gun

Service history
- In service: 1880–1947?
- Used by: United Kingdom
- Wars: Second Boer War

Production history
- Variants: Mks I – V

Specifications
- Mass: Mk I – II : 38 long hundredweight (1,930 kg); Mk III – V : 40 long hundredweight (2,030 kg)
- Barrel length: 125 inches (3,175 mm) bore (25 calibres)
- Shell: 50 pounds (22.68 kg)
- Calibre: 5-inch (127.0 mm)
- Breech: de Bange
- Muzzle velocity: 1,750 feet per second (533 m/s)
- Maximum firing range: 8,700 yards (8,000 m)

The BL 5-inch guns Mk I – Mk V (Note: Mk I – Mk V = Marks 1 through to 5. Britain used Roman numerals to denote Marks (models) of ordnance until after World War II. Hence this article covers the five models of BL 5-inch naval guns.) were early British 5-inch rifled breechloading naval guns after it switched from rifled muzzle-loaders in the late 1870s. They were originally designed to use the old gunpowder propellants. The 5-inch calibre was soon discontinued in favour of QF 4.7-inch.

== Naval service ==
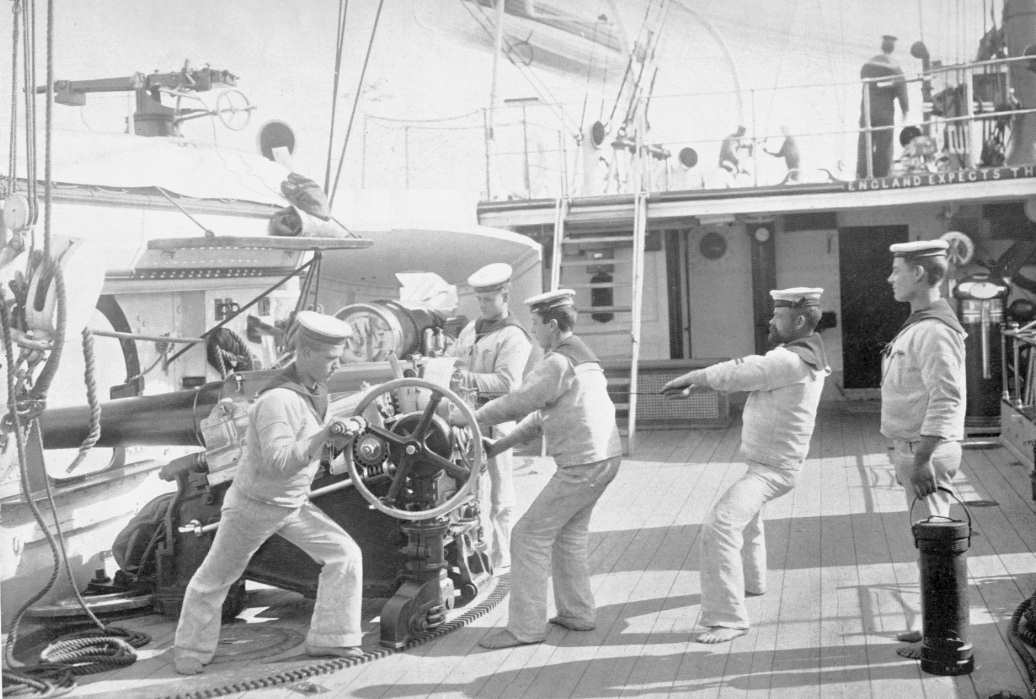
Working a starboard broadside gun on Vavasseur recoil mounting on HMS Calliope

Guns equipped the following British warships :

- Mariner-class gunvessels of 1883
- Satellite-class sloops of 1883
- Comus-class corvettes as re-gunned in the 1880s
- Nymphe-class sloops laid down in 1885
- Calypso-class third class cruiser/corvettes of 1883–1884
- Iris-class cruisers as re-gunned in 1888
- Beagle-class sloops of 1889
- Bacchante-class corvettes as re-gunned in the 1880s

These guns also equipped several small gunboats of Colonial navies of Australia in the 1880s in response to the perceived threat of Russian expansionism in the Pacific (The "Russian scares").

== Second Boer War (1899–1902) field gun ==
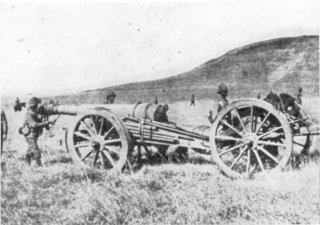
In South Africa, circa. 1900

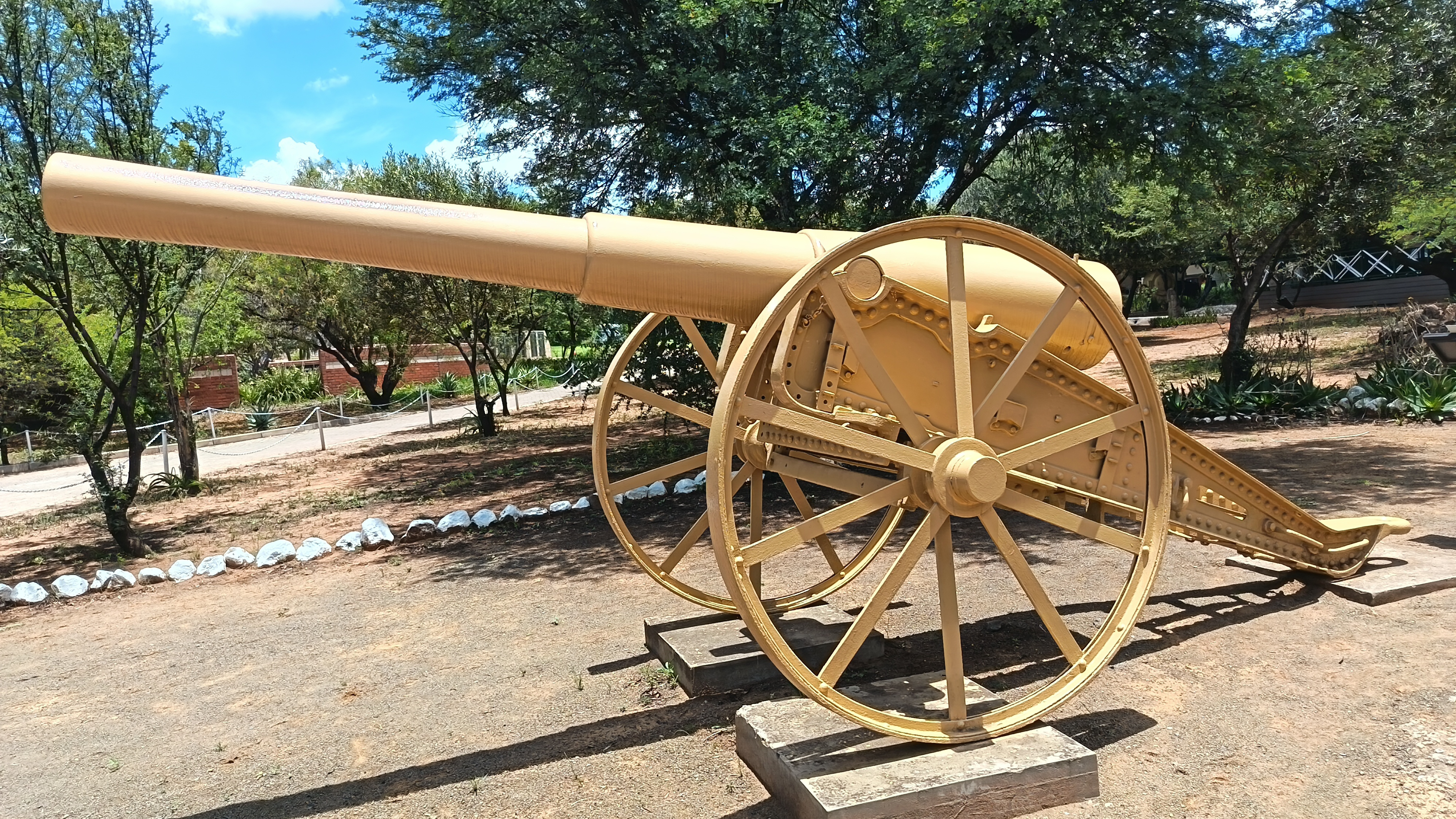
5-inch Armstrong Mark II 40-pounder rifled undercarriage, War Museum, Bloemfontein, South Africa, 2025.

A number of guns mounted on carriages from obsolete RML 40 pounder guns accompanied the British siege train (heavy artillery) to South Africa. They were not required for the expected siege of Pretoria, which did not eventuate. Its usefulness in the field was limited by lack of a recoil control system, and the QF 4.7-inch gun was the most commonly used British heavy gun in the war.

== Coast defence gun ==
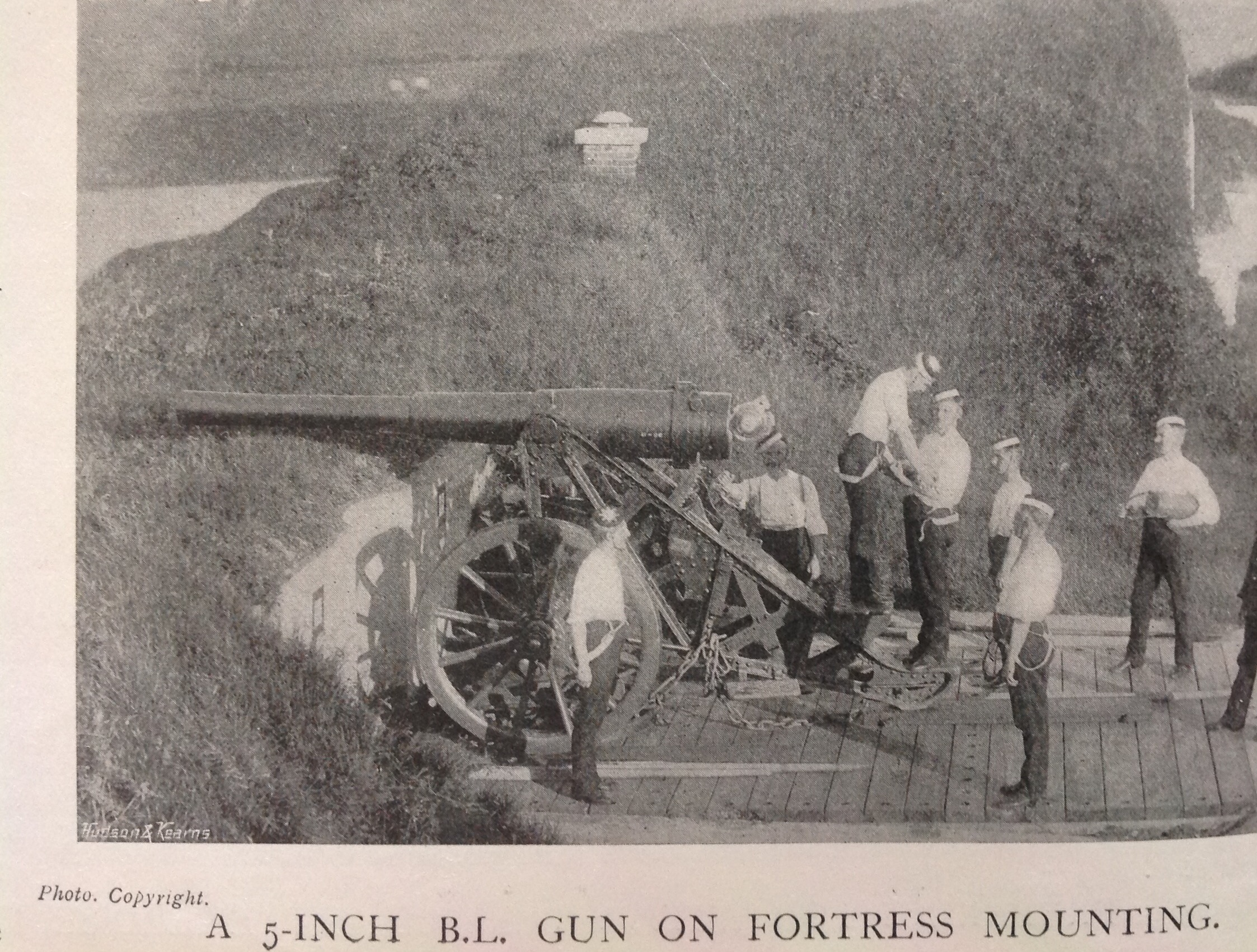
Gun on Fortress mount in UK, c1900

The gun was installed as a conventional coast defence gun in South Africa and Australia, and several in the United Kingdom. Its more common use ashore in the UK was as "moveable armaments" in forts: on 2-wheeled carriages similar to field carriages but intended only for moving short distances to position guns for defence of the fort. These used either obsolete 40-pounder RML carriages or special high-mounting carriages for firing over parapets with recoil controlled by a hydraulic buffer built into the platform to which the carriage was fastened. A number were also set up in practise batteries adjacent to fortifications and batteries.

== Ammunition ==
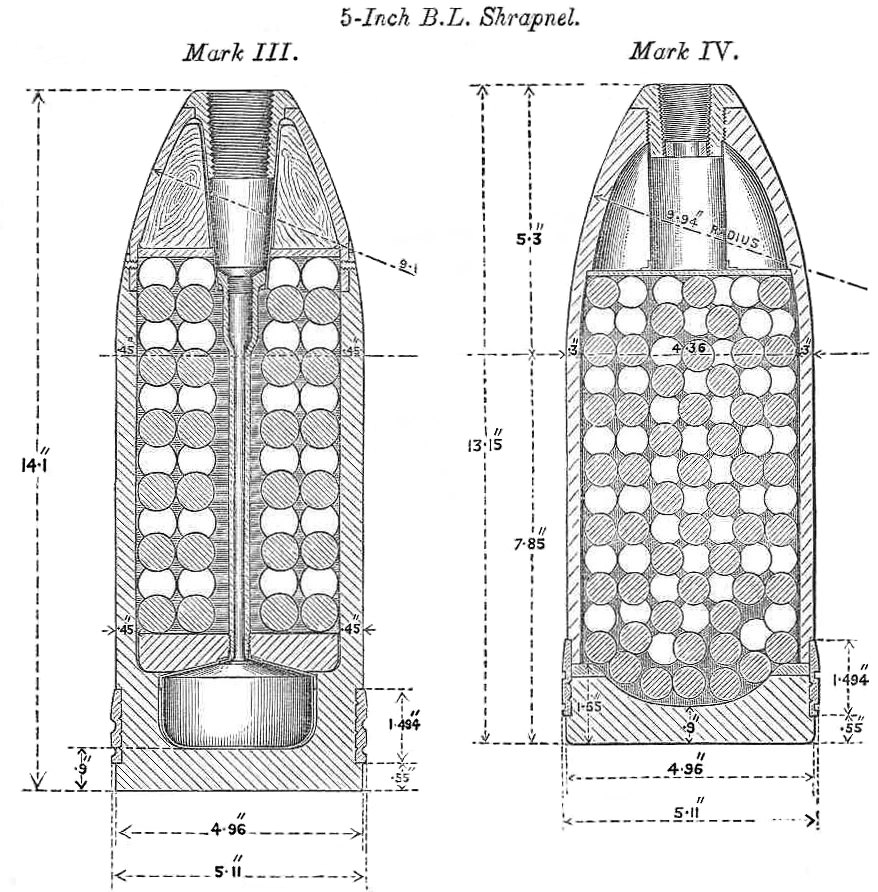
Mk III and IV shrapnel shells

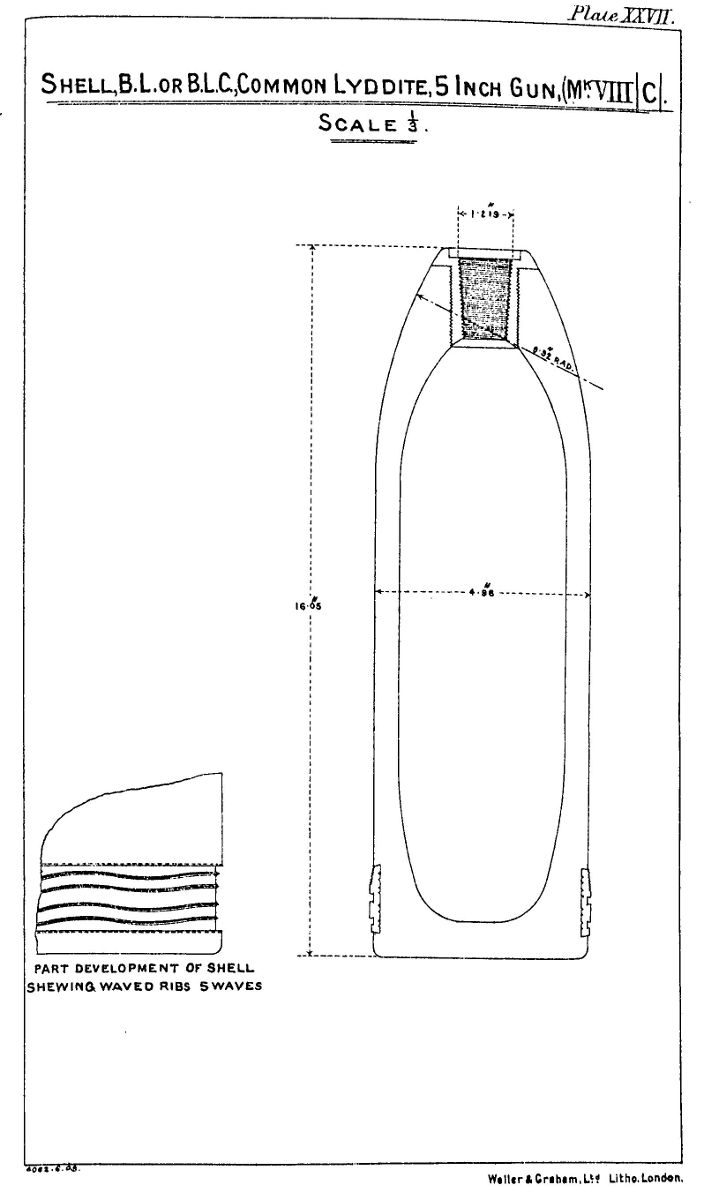
BL 5-inch common lyddite shell Mk VIII diagram

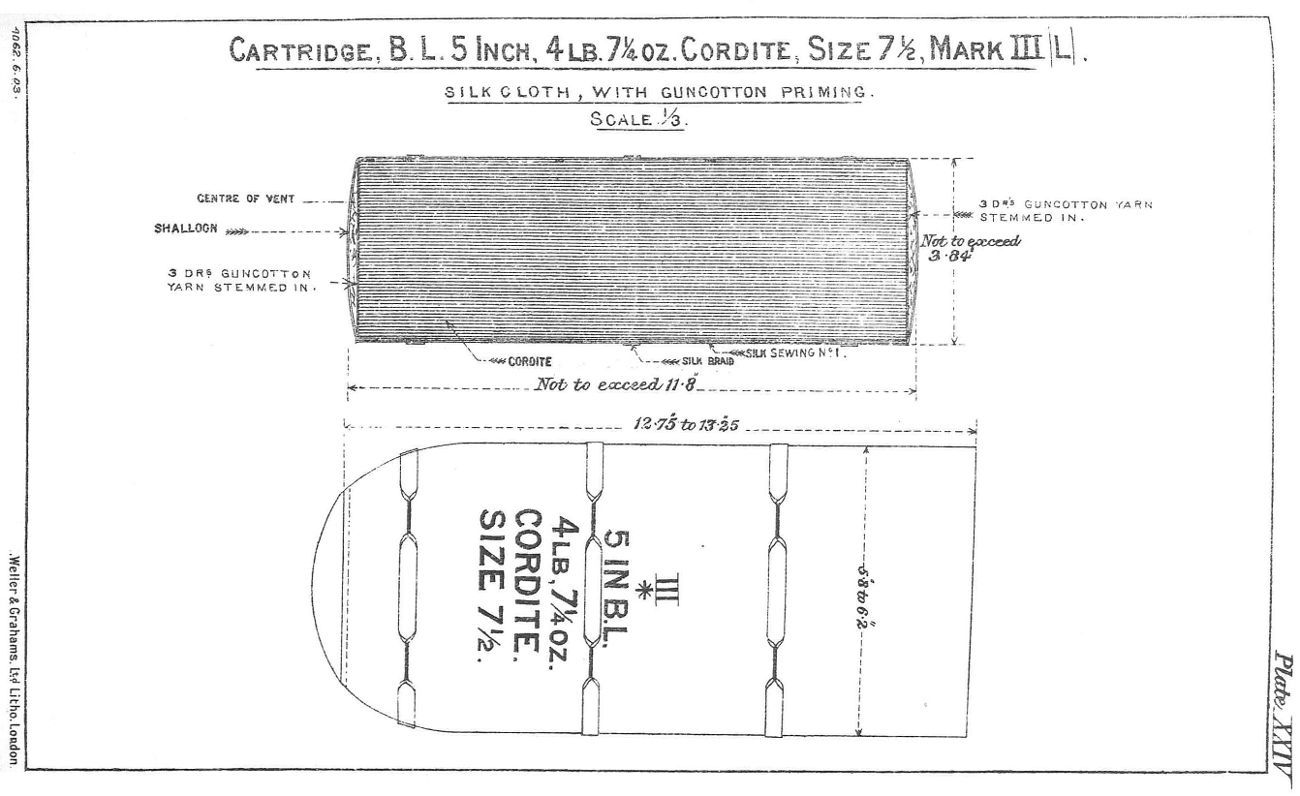
BL 5-inch gun 4lb 7.5 oz cordite cartridge Mark III diagrams

The gun was designed to fire a number of different types of projectile. Common shell could be used against earthworks, buildings and other vehicles and artillery. Shrapnel shell was designed for use against soft targets, such as troops or cavalry, at longer ranges – for soft targets within 400 yards case shot could be used. Palliser shot was designed for use against hard targets, such as enemy ships, where it could penetrate armour plate.

Initially, the gun used black powder propellant, but this was changed for Cordite propellant in the 1890s. Similarly, the black powder filling for common shells was changed for the much more powerful Lyddite filling, which increased the effect of the shell.

== See also ==
- List of naval guns

== Surviving examples ==
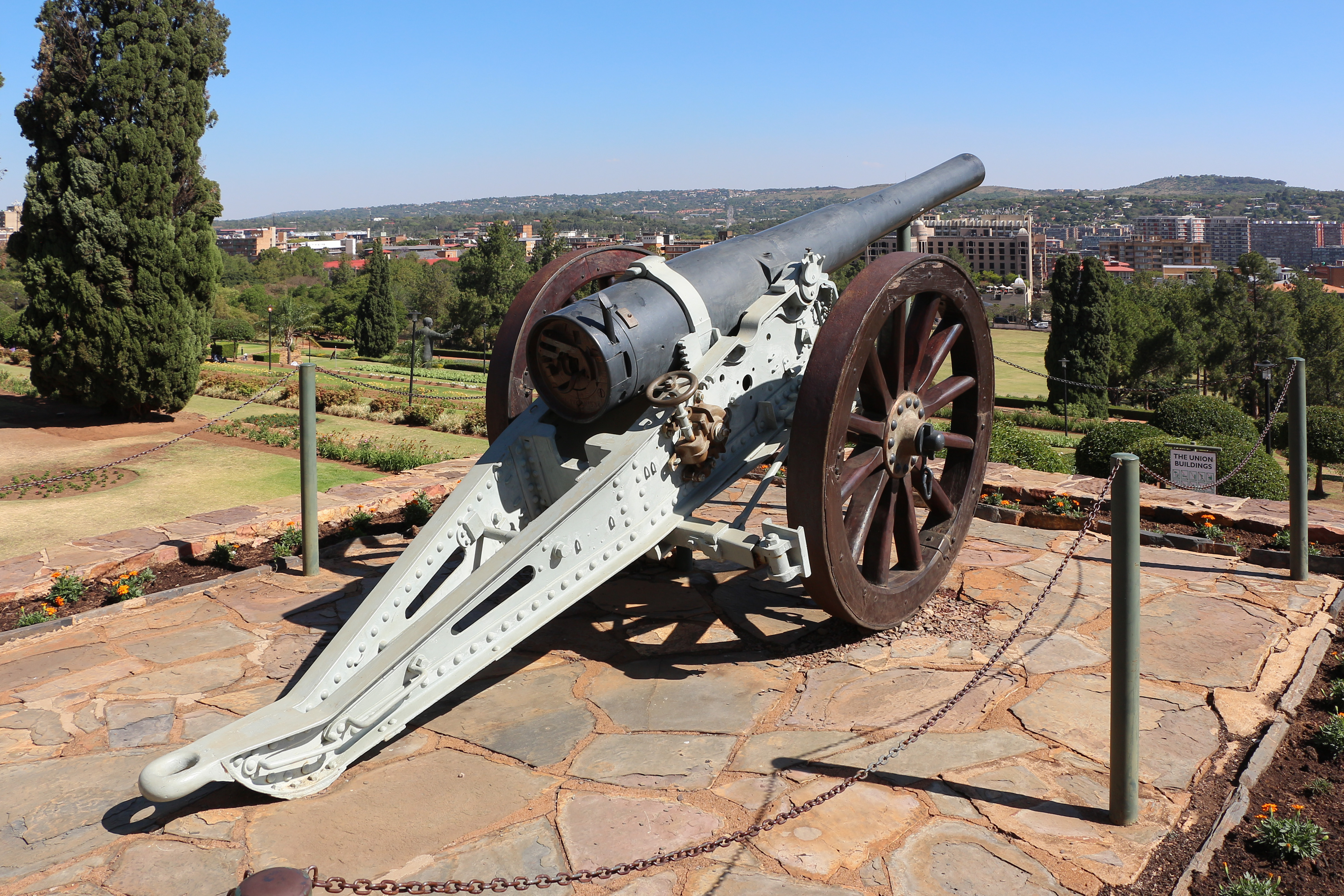
One of two guns outside the Union Buildings, Pretoria, South Africa

- A gun on the deck of HMS Gannet, Chatham, UK.
- 2 guns on 40-pounder RML field carriages, outside the Union Buildings, Pretoria, South Africa
- Outside the entrance to the Hong Kong Museum of Coastal Defence
- Two guns outside the old school gunnery offices at HMAS Cerberus, Royal Australian Navy training base south of Melbourne, Victoria, Australia
- No. 479 on Vavasseur mount at Queens Park, Maryborough, Queensland, Australia,
- A gun on Vavasseur mount at The Esplanade, Cairns, Queensland, Australia
- A gun on Vavasseur mount at the Maritime Museum of Townsville, Queensland, Australia
- A 5-inch Armstrong Mark II 40-pounder rifled undercarriage, standing at the Anglo Boer War Museum, Bloemfontein, South Africa, 2025.
- A 5-inch breach loading coastal gun on a 40 pounder carriage at the South African National Museum of Military History in Johannesburg

== Bibliography ==
- Text Book of Gunnery, 1887. LONDON : PRINTED FOR HIS MAJESTY'S STATIONERY OFFICE, BY HARRISON AND SONS, ST. MARTIN'S LANE
- Text Book of Gunnery, 1902. LONDON : PRINTED FOR HIS MAJESTY'S STATIONERY OFFICE, BY HARRISON AND SONS, ST. MARTIN'S LANE
- Major D Hall, The South African Military History Society. Military History Journal – Vol 2 No 3 June 1972. Guns in South Africa 1899–1902 Part V and VI
- I.V.Hogg & L.F. Thurston, British Artillery Weapons & Ammunition 1914–1918. London: Ian Allan, 1972.
- Lyon, David & Winfield, Rif (2004). The Sail and Steam Navy List: All the Ships of the Royal Navy 1815–1889. Chatham Publishing. ISBN 978-1-86176-032-6. OCLC 52620555.
- Preston, Antony; Major, John (2007). Send a Gunboat: The Victorian Navy and Supremacy at Sea, 1854–1904 (2nd ed.). London: Conway. ISBN 978-0-85177-923-2.
