= Send a Gunboat =

Send a Gunboat: The Victorian Navy and Supremacy at Sea, 1854–1904
- Front Cover
- Author: Antony Preston & John Major
- Language: English
- Subject: The role of the gunboat in British foreign policy in the second half of the 19th century
- Publisher: Conway Maritime Publishing
- Publication date: 1967 (2nd Ed. 2007)
- Pages: 208
- ISBN: 978-0-85177-923-2
- OCLC: 228664193

Send a Gunboat: The Victorian Navy and Supremacy at Sea, 1854–1904 by Antony Preston and John Major is a naval reference work on small warships of the Victorian Royal Navy, first published in 1967.

The second edition has a foreword by Professor Andrew Lambert which concludes that the contemporary relevance of this book has never been stronger.

Despite the emergence of much new work since 1967, addressing almost every aspect of the subject ... the book remains the baseline for any study of naval force in British Imperial diplomacy between the Crimean War of 1854-56 and the Entente Cordiale of 1904.

— Professor Andrew Lambert
