= Bering Sea Anti-Poaching Operations =

British–American operation against seal poaching

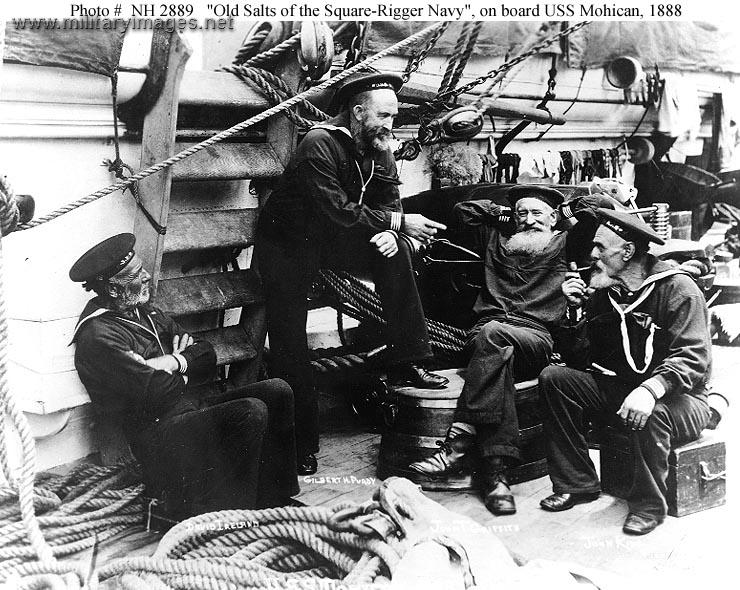
- "Old Salts of the Square-Rigger Navy" on board USS Mohican, 1888, by H. W. Whitaker.
Date	June 22 – October 5, 1891
Location	Bering Sea, Pacific Ocean
Result	Anglo-American victory

Belligerents
United States: U.S. Navy; U.S. RCS; U.S. Marines; United Kingdom: Royal Navy; Royal Marines	Canadian Poachers

Commanders and leaders
(United States) Charles S. Cotton (United States) Henry C. Cochrane	N/A

Strength
1 cruiser 3 sloops-of-war 3 steamers 2 gunboats 2 cutters	N/A

Casualties and losses
None	4 schooners captured Poachers imprisoned in Unalaska

Bering Sea Anti-Poaching Operations were conducted in 1891 by the navies and marine corps' of the United States and the United Kingdom of Great Britain and Ireland. Due to the near extinction of the seal population in the Bering Sea, the American and British governments dispatched a squadron of warships to suppress poaching activities, under the command of United States Navy Commander Charles S. Cotton.

== Operations ==
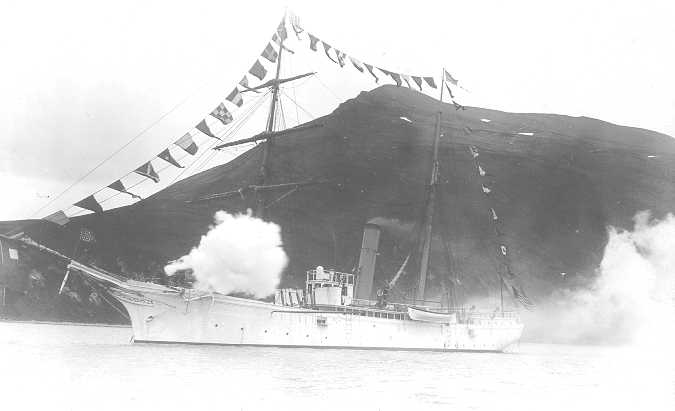
USRC Rush firing a salute off Sitka in 1901.

The operations against seal poachers had their origin in the 1880s after Canada claimed the fishing rights around many of the Aleutian Islands, in violation of United States law. As a result, the United States Navy Pacific Squadron seized several Canadian ships. Also, the near extinction of seals by poachers from the Dominion of Canada and the United States drew the interests of the Naturalist societies who pressured their governments to respond so in 1891 President Benjamin Harrison and his British counterparts banned sealing in the Bering Sea and ordered the formation of a new naval squadron. The new force, led by the American Commander Charles S. Cotton, composed of small warships intended to police the disputed fishing zone and inform all merchant ships of the ban. Eleven United States Navy, Royal Navy and United States Revenue Cutter Service ships participated in the operations. The flagship of the squadron was USS Mohican, a screw sloop-of-war, under Commander Cotton. The other American ships were USS Marion, an old sailing sloop, the steamer USS Thetis, the gunboats USS Alert and USS Ranger and the steam-powered revenue cutters USRC Corwin and USCR Rush. The Pacific Coast Steamship Company vessel Al-Ki was also chartered for service, filled with marines, she was placed under the command of Captain Henry C. Cochrane of the United States Marine Corps. Al-Ki was used as a prison ship at Unalaska for captured poachers.

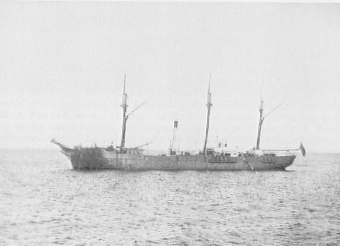
HMS Alert in 1893.

All of the American ships had marine detachments aboard, with the exception of the Thetis, totaling five officers and 113 enlisted men. British naval forces included the cruiser HMS Porpoise, the screw sloop HMS Nymphe and the steamer HMS Pheasant, each with a force of Royal Marines. The operations officially began on June 22, 1891 when the Al-Ki hauled off from Mare Island Naval Shipyard for the Bering Sea and she was soon followed by the other vessels. Over the course of a few months the squadron boarded dozens of ships though only four were found to be infringing upon the proclamation of the United States and the United Kingdom. They were the schooners E. B. Marvin and the Otto of British subject and the American schooners La Mifa and Ethel. The American schooners had a force of marines placed aboard and were towed over 1,200 miles by the Al-Ki to Sitka. While the naval ships weren't in action against poachers they spent their time drilling and practice firing. The American marines also conducted exhibition drills at Sitka and Lliuliuk which were appreciated by the inhabitants. In late September, as the storm season approached, the remaining whaling and sealing ships in the Bering Sea left the region for coastal waters. Naval operations officially ended on October 5 when the last American warships headed south for Mare Island, where they arrived on October 14. They had patrolled 6,600 nautical miles since June 22. British forces sailed back to the East Asian coast. The owners of forty-one vessels protested and demanded compensation for the breaking up of their sealing activities.

== See also ==
- African Slave Trade Patrol
- West Indies Anti-Piracy Operations of the United States
- Aegean Sea Anti-Piracy Operations of the United States
- Bering Sea Arbitration
