= Leutze =

Leutze is the surname of the following notable people:

- Emanuel Leutze (1816–1868), painter of American Revolutionary War scenes
- Eugene H. C. Leutze (1847–1931), admiral of the United States Navy
  - USS Leutze (DD-481), a United States Navy destroyer named in honor of the admiral
