= Charles S. Cotton =

American Navy admiral (1843–1909)

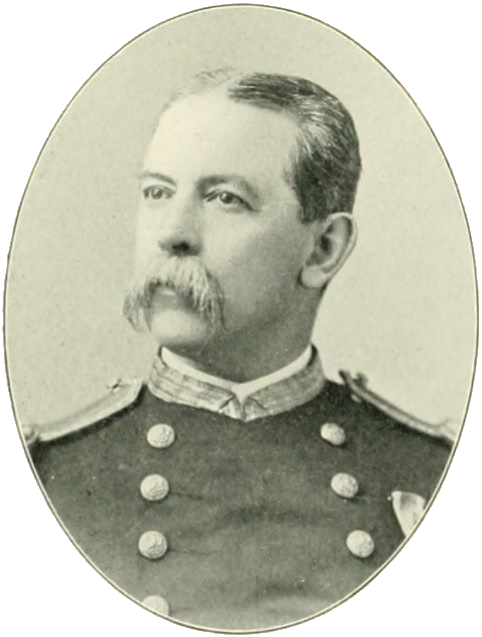
- Born: 15 February 1843; Milwaukee, Wisconsin, US
- Died: 19 February 1909 (aged 66); Nice, France
- Military career
- Allegiance: United States
- Branch: Union Navy; United States Navy
- Service years: 1861–1904
- Rank: Rear Admiral
- Commands: European Squadron; Norfolk Navy Yard and Station; USS Harvard; USS Philadelphia; USS Independence; Bering Sea Patrol Squadron; USS Mohican; USS Alert; USS Monocacy
- Conflicts: American Civil War; Spanish–American War

Charles Stanhope Cotton Sr. (15 February 1843 – 19 February 1909) was a United States Navy rear admiral who served in the Union Navy during the American Civil War and later participated in the Spanish–American War. His final assignment was as commander of the European Squadron from 1903 to 1904.

== Early life and education ==
Born in Milwaukee, Wisconsin, Cotton received his early education in Milwaukee and Detroit, Michigan. He was appointed to the United States Naval Academy from Wisconsin's 1st congressional district by John F. Potter. Cotton became an acting midshipman on 23 September 1858 at the age of fifteen. After the outbreak of the Civil War, he was graduated on 10 May 1861 at the age of eighteen.

== Military career ==
After graduation as a passed midshipman, Cotton was assigned to the frigate St. Lawrence from 7 June to 15 August 1861. On 28 June, he participated in the chase and sinking of the Confederate privateer Petrel. From 19 November 1861 to 24 February 1863, Cotton served aboard the steam frigate Minnesota. On 8–9 March 1862, he participated in the Battle of Hampton Roads as commander of the quarterdeck gun battery. On 11 November 1862, Cotton was promoted to ensign while still only nineteen years old.

From 24 February to 13 July 1863, Cotton was assigned to the sloop of war Iroquois. From 8 March 1864 to 10 August 1865, he served aboard the sloop of war Oneida except for a few weeks of detached service aboard the sloop of war Hartford and the gunboat Kineo. On 22 February 1864, Cotton was promoted to lieutenant. On 5 August 1864, he participated in the Battle of Mobile Bay aboard the Oneida.

After the war, Cotton was assigned to the screw sloop Shenandoah from 13 November 1865 to 3 May 1869. He was promoted to lieutenant commander on 25 July 1866. The ship first visited Brazil, then proceeded to India, Siam, Japan, Corea and China. For eight months of the extended cruise, Cotton served as navigator and watch officer. From 30 September 1869 to 29 July 1870, he was assigned to the Naval Academy. From 1 October to 23 December 1870, Cotton served at the Kittery Navy Yard.

From 5 January to 24 April 1871, Cotton served aboard the screw frigate Tennessee on a visit to the Dominican Republic to explore establishment of an American naval base at Samaná Bay. From 24 April 1871 to 16 February 1874, he served as executive officer of the screw sloop of war Ticonderoga in the vicinity of Brazil. From 1 May 1874 to 1 June 1876, Cotton returned to the Kittery Navy Yard. From 15 September to 4 October 1876, he served as executive officer of the receiving ship Worcester at the Norfolk Navy Yard. From October 1876 to July 1880, Cotton was assigned to New York Navy Yard. On 25 April 1877, he was promoted to commander.

Cotton was given command of the sidewheel gunboat Monocacy from September 1880 to June 1881 in the western Pacific and from July 1881 to September 1883 in the vicinity of Corea. From June to July 1881, he commanded the steamer gunboat Alert for six weeks. In the summer of 1883, Monocacy conveyed a new Corean ambassador and his staff to Japan on their way to the United States, where they established the first accredited Corean embassy outside of Asia. From January 1884 to October 1887, Cotton was assigned to the Norfolk Navy Yard as inspector of ordnance. From October 1887 to December 1890, he served as inspector of the Fifteenth Lighthouse District.

From April 1891 to May 1892, Cotton was given command of the sloop of war Mohican. During this period, he also commanded the Anglo-American Bering Sea Patrol Squadron to combat seal poaching from 22 June to 5 October 1891. On 28 May 1892, Cotton was promoted to captain. From May 1892 to 15 August 1894, he commanded the receiving ship Independence at the Mare Island Navy Yard. From 24 August 1894 to 1 September 1897, Cotton was given command of the protected cruiser Philadelphia, which was serving as flagship of the Navy's Pacific Station.

During the Spanish–American War, Cotton commanded the auxiliary cruiser Harvard from 25 April to 2 September 1898. Acting as a scout ship, Harvard sighted Admiral Cervera's squadron near Martinique on 11 May 1898. In early June 1898, Harvard steamed to Newport News, Virginia to load troops from the 9th Massachusetts Regiment and the 34th Michigan Regiment. She landed them at Siboney, Cuba on 1 July. After the destruction of Admiral Cervera's squadron on 3 July, Harvard rescued almost 700 survivors. She then conveyed more than 1000 prisoners of war to the United States, delivering the officers to the Naval Academy in Maryland and the enlisted men to the Portsmouth Navy Yard in New Hampshire. Returning to Cuba, Harvard loaded the 33rd Michigan Regiment at Santiago and delivered the troops to Montauk Point on Long Island in August.

After the war, Cotton returned to the Mare Island Navy Yard as captain of the yard from 3 October 1898 to 19 April 1899. He then commanded the Independence again from 19 April 1899 to 23 March 1900. Cotton was promoted to rear admiral on 27 March 1900, serving as president of the Retiring Board in Washington, D.C. from 26 March to 14 July. He then became commandant of the Norfolk Navy Yard and Station from 16 July 1900 to early 1903. Cotton served as commander of the European Squadron from 28 April 1903 until his retirement from active duty on 16 February 1904. On 7 July 1903, he visited Portsmouth, England aboard his flagship the battleship Kearsarge, accompanied by the protected cruisers Chicago and San Francisco and the schooner-rigged gunboat Machias. After arrival, Cotton met with British admirals Sir Charles Hotham, Lord Charles Beresford, Sir John Hopkins and Sir Berkeley Milne.

== Personal ==
Cotton was the son of Lester Holt Cotton and Mary Ann (White) Cotton.

On 30 August 1865, Cotton married Rebecca Cecilia Robertson (30 October 1843 – 7 January 1926). Their son Charles Stanhope Cotton Jr. (19 March 1870 – 11 October 1926) served as a captain in the Army Air Service during World War I.

After his retirement, Cotton and his wife lived in Washington, D.C. In February 1909, he died in Nice, France. His cremated remains were returned to the United States and interred in Section 2 of Arlington National Cemetery on 15 May 1909.
