= Gottfried Blocklinger =

United States Navy Admiral (1847-1930)

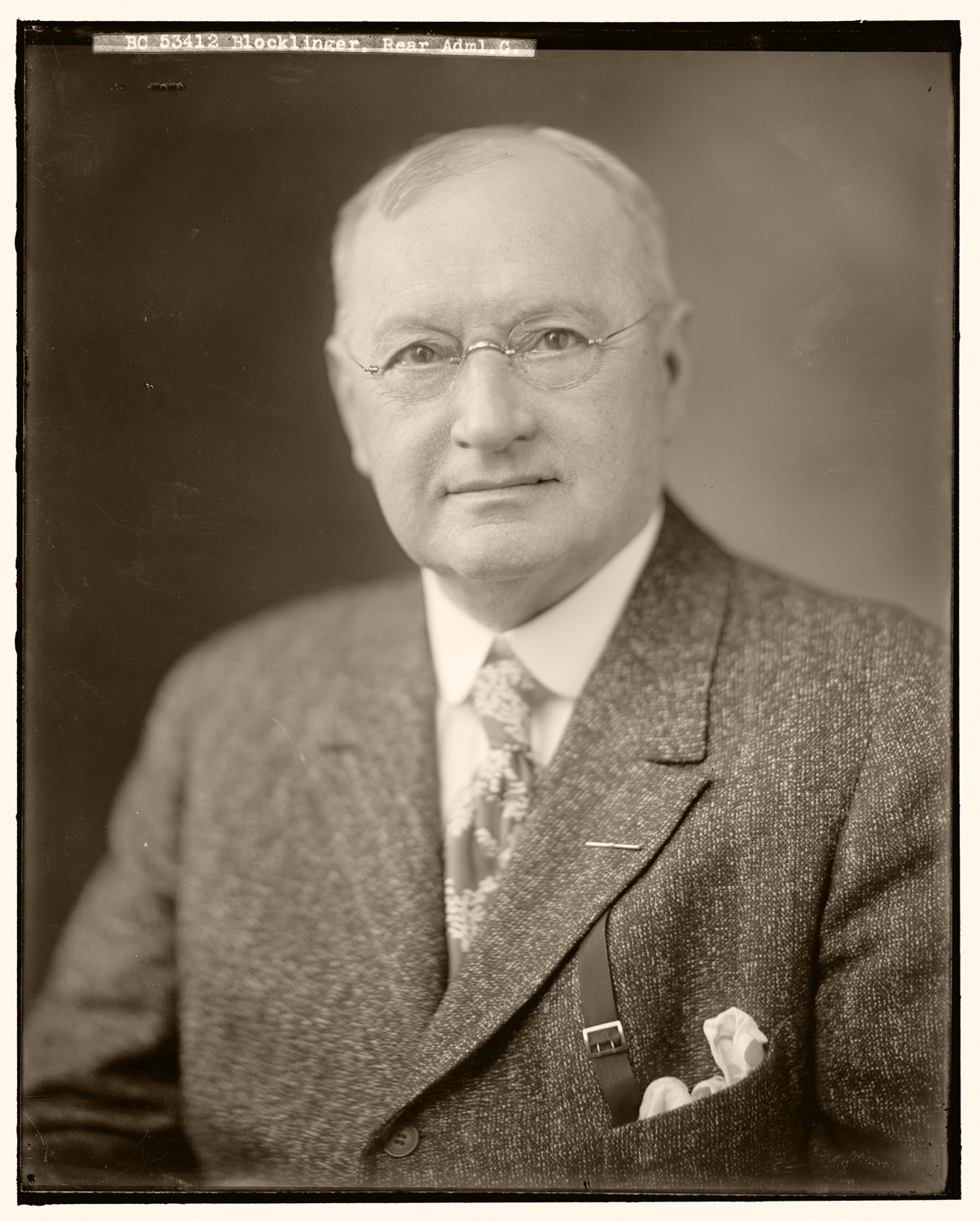
- Blocklinger in a photograph by Harris & Ewing.
- Born: October 23, 1847; Dubuque, Iowa
- Died: May 18, 1930 (aged 82)
- Military career
- Allegiance: United States
- Branch: United States Navy
- Service years: 1863-1909, 46 years
- Rank: Rear-admiral
- Commands: USS Concord USS Alert USS Illinois
- Conflicts: American Civil War; Baltimore crisis; Spanish–American War

Gottfried Blocklinger (1847-1930) was a Rear-admiral in the United States Navy.

== Early life and career ==
Blocklinger was born in Dubuque, Iowa on October 23, 1847. He was admitted to the United States Naval Academy in 1863 and graduated in 1868. Notable achievements include: in 1879 as a Lieutenant, he commanded the survey of the Madeira River, in the Amazon. Was a lieutenant on board the USS Baltimore during the Baltimore crisis of 1891. And was the Executive Officer, on board the USS Charleston during the Capture of Guam to the United States during the Spanish–American War in 1898.

== Service Record ==
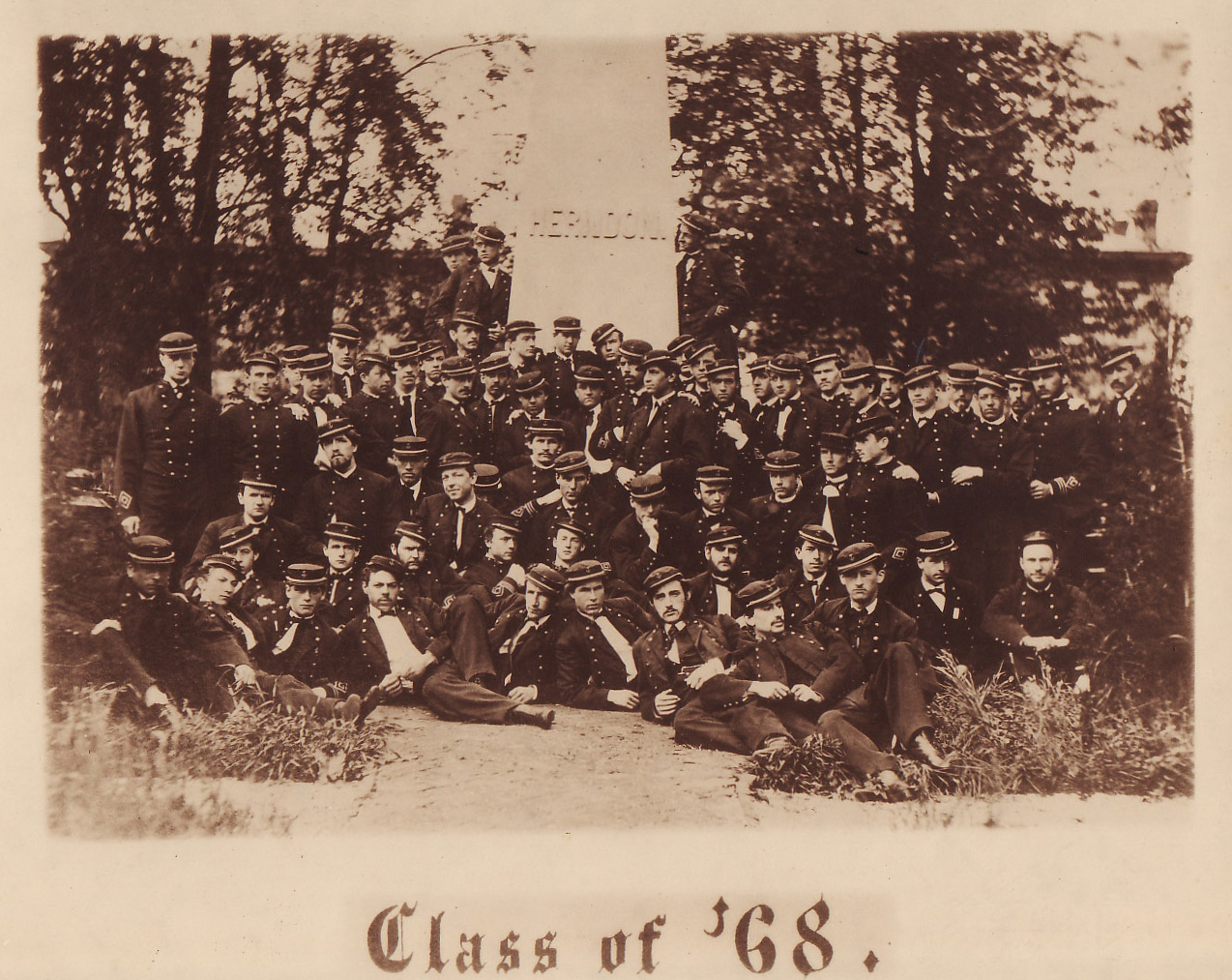
Gottfried Blocklinger, posed 6th from right, in the United States Naval Academy Graduating Class of 1868 in front of Herndon Monument

1863-69; During the American Civil War he was a midshipman at the US Naval Academy. His assignments included service on board the USS Marion in summer of 1864. And served successively in the Pacific squadron on board the USS Kearsarge in 1869, Enterprise, and Adams.
1868-82; Coast survey
1880 Served aboard the USS Adams
1885; hydrographic office
1883-86; USS Alliance
1888-89; insp. 7th light-house dist., (the western coast of Florida)
1890; USS Richmond which was assigned to the South Atlantic Station
1891; USS Baltimore Was transferred to the Yorktown during the Baltimore crisis.
1891-93; USS Yorktown,
1893; Washington Navy Yard
1893-95; Executive Officer USS Boston
1895-96; Mare Island Naval Shipyard California.
1897-99; Executive Officer, USS Charleston
1899-01; Commanding Officer USS Concord,
1901; Commanding Officer USS Alert
11 May 1901 Assigned to Alert'—11 May 1901, Comdr. Gottfried Blocklinger commanded the vessel and was assigned to the Pacific Station as a training vessel for apprentice sailors. In that capacity the vessel made short cruises along the California coast
1901, USS Wheeling,
1902, USS Vicksburg, cruising the waters off the coasts of China, Japan, and Korea
1902, USS New Orleans flagship of the Cruiser Squadron, U.S. Asiatic Fleet, she cruised the Philippines and the China coast.,
1903; Navy Yard, Norfolk, Virginia,
1904; Navy Yard, New York,
1904-06; Commanding Officer USS Illinois, At that time, the Illinois was assigned to the North Atlantic. She engaged in fleet maneuvers, gunnery and seamanship training, and ceremonial operations. In 1906, the Illinois was the first US ship to win the famous Prince Louis Battenberg Cup
1906-09; Member Naval Examining and Retiring Boards. No officer below the grade of Captain can be promoted to a higher grade until recommended by the Boards.
1909; Retired to 1192 Locust St., Dubuque, Iowa

Admiral Blocklinger was a companion of the District of Columbia Commandery of the Military Order of the Loyal Legion of the United States. He was assigned insignia number 18,220 and was one of the last Civil War veterans to join the Order.

== Promotions ==
Acting midshipman, 22 July 1863
Graduated United States Naval Academy, 2 June 1868
Promoted to ensign, April 19, 1869
Promoted to master, July 12, 1870
Promoted to lieutenant, April 2, 1874
Promoted to lieutenant-commander., May 21, 1895
Promoted to commander, March 3, 1899
Promoted to captain., June 1, 1904
Promoted to rear-admiral, October 30, 1908
Retired, October 23, 1909

== Sources and external links ==
- DEPARTMENT OF THE NAVY—NAVAL HISTORICAL CENTER
- Chambers's Encyclopedia. The Records Of Living Officers Of The U. S. Navy And Marine Corps Fourth Edition. 1890 L. R. Hamersly & Co. 1890. Pg 190-191
- Who's Who in America Volume XI, 1920-1921
- The Call, a San Francisco newspaper, includes Blocklinger and covers the Capture of Guam
- Report of the Secretary of the Navy, November 30, 1879
