= CSS Jeff Davis =

CSS Jeff Davis may refer to the following ships of the Confederate States Navy:

- CSS Jeff Davis (gunboat), a Confederate gunboat, captured by the Union forces.
- CSS Jeff Davis (1863 steamship), a steamship, was reported in poor condition in October 1863.
- CSS Jeff Davis (schooner), two-masted schooner that was captured.
- CSS Jeff Davis (1864 steamship), a steamboat that was surrendered at the end of the war.

== See also ==
- Jefferson Davis (privateer), confederate privateer brig.
- List of ships of the Confederate States Navy
