= John Enright =

United States Navy sailor (1864 – 1898)

- Navy Medal of Honor
- Born: July 2, 1864; Lynn, Massachusetts
- Died: February 19, 1898 (aged 33); Off the coast of Vallejo, California
- Burial place: At sea
- Military career
- Allegiance: United States of America
- Branch: United States Navy
- Service years: 1885 to 1889
- Rank: Landsman
- Units: USS Ranger; USS Dolphin (PG-24); USS Trenton (1876); USS Nipsic; USS Albatross (1882)
- Awards: Medal of Honor

John Enright (July 2, 1864 – February 19, 1898) was a United States Navy sailor and a recipient of the United States military's highest decoration, the Medal of Honor.

== Biography ==
Born on July 2, 1864, in Lynn, Massachusetts, Enright joined the Navy from that state. By January 18, 1886, he was serving as a landsman on the USS Ranger. On that day, while Ranger was off the coast of Ensenada, Mexico, he jumped overboard and rescued two fellow sailors, Ordinary Seamen John Bell and George Svensson, from drowning. For this action, he was awarded the Medal of Honor.

Enright's official Medal of Honor citation reads:

On board the U.S.S. Ranger off Ensenada, Mexico, 18 January 1886. Jumping overboard from that vessel, Enright rescued John Bell, ordinary seaman, and George Svensson, ordinary seaman, from drowning.

Enright was honorably discharged from the Navy on May 21, 1889. He died at age 33 on February 19, 1898, and was buried at sea. A marker in his memory was placed at Phoenix Memorial Park in Phoenix, Arizona.

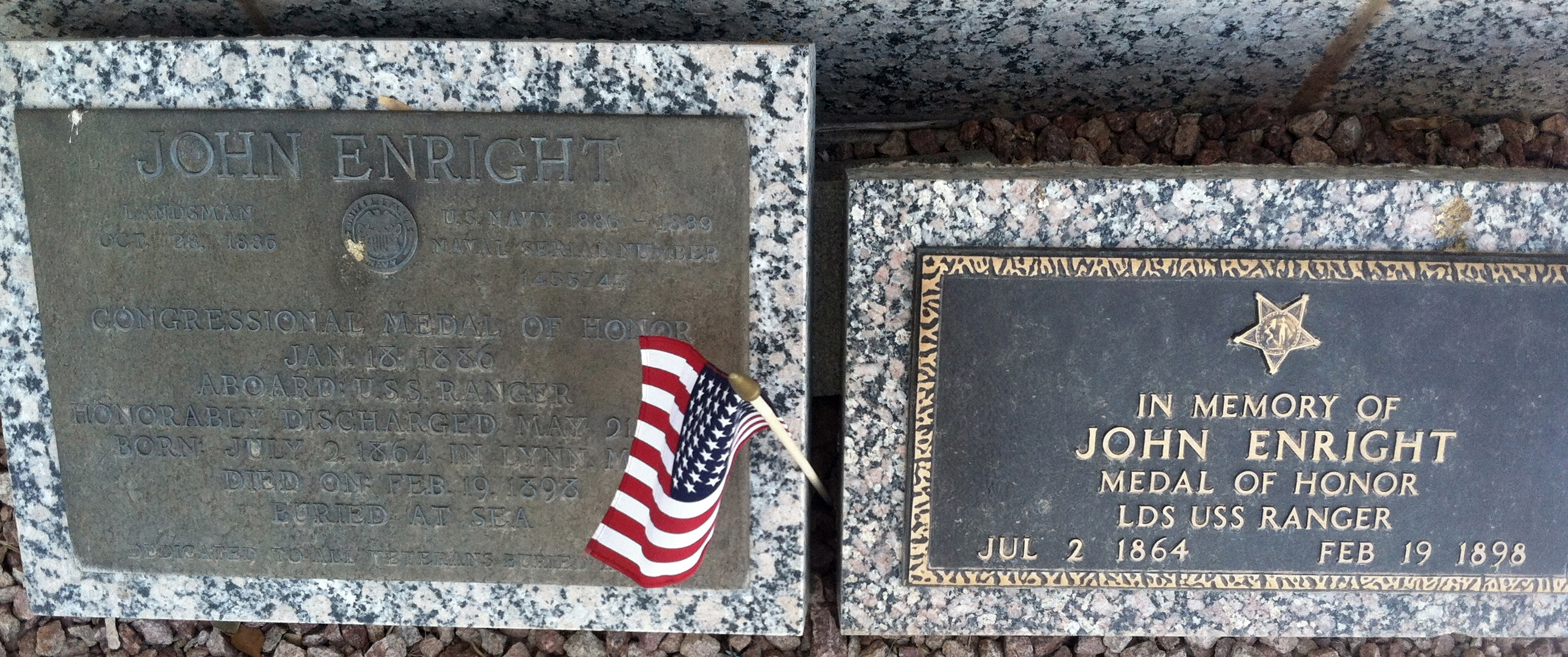
Grave marker of John Enright

== See also ==
- List of Medal of Honor recipients during peacetime
