= Bering Sea Squadron =

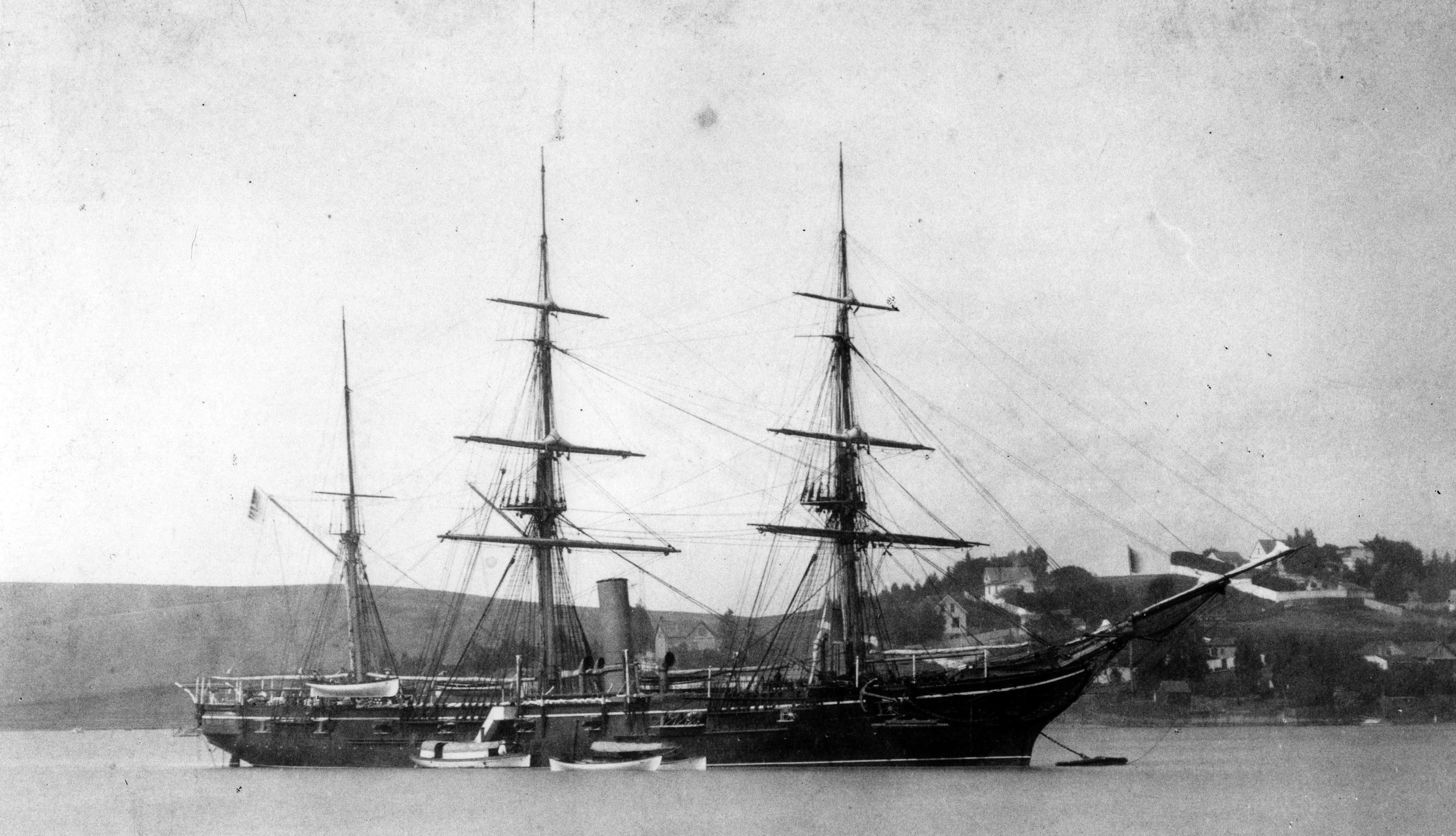
- USS Mohican was the flagship of the Bering Sea Squadron.
- Active: 1891
- Country: United States; United Kingdom
- Branch: United States Navy (United Kingdom) Royal Navy
- Type: naval squadron

The Bering Sea Squadron was a combined American and British naval station formed and disbanded in 1891 to suppress seal poaching in the Bering Sea. Eleven vessels were assigned to the squadron including eight United States Navy and Revenue Cutter Service ships plus three from the Royal Navy.

== Anti-Poaching Operations ==
The United States and United Kingdom government banned sealing in the Bering Sea in 1891 due to the near extinction of the animals so that year Commander Charles S. Cotton of the American navy was ordered to lead a force of two sloops, USS Mohican and USS Marion, two steamers, USS Thetis and SS Al-Ki, plus the gunboats USS Alert and USS Ranger to operate against poachers. The revenue cutters USRC Rush and USRC Corwin were also placed under Cotton's command. British forces sent the cruiser HMS Porpoise, the screw sloop HMS Nymphe and the steamer HMS Pheasant. From the beginning of the operation on June 22, 1891 to its end on October 5, American and British marines boarded and expelled dozens of merchant vessels mainly around the Aleutian Islands though only four schooners were found to be hunting seals illegally. Two of these vessels were taken over by marines and towed over 1,200 miles by the Al-Ki to Sitka, the other two were taken into British custody and sent to Asia.

== Ships of the Squadron ==
Ship	Type	Branch
Mohican	screw sloop-of-war	USN
Marion	sloop-of-war	USN
Alert	gunboat	USN
Ranger	gunboat	USN
Thetis	steamer	USN
Al-Ki	steamer	USN
Rush	cutter	USRCS
Corwin	cutter	USRCS
Porpoise	cruiser	RN
Nymphe	screw sloop-of-war	RN
Pheasant	steamer	RN
