= Eugene Henry Cozzens Leutze =

United States Navy admiral (1847–1931)

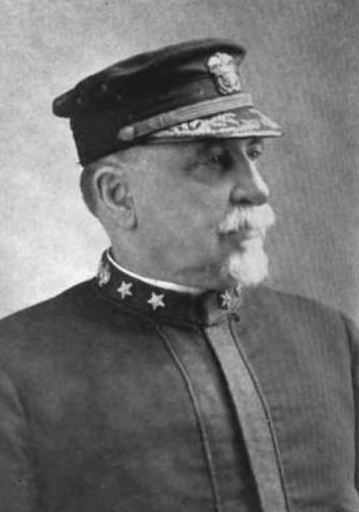
- Born: 16 November 1847; Düsseldorf, Prussia
- Died: 15 September 1931 (aged 83); Brooklyn Naval Hospital, New York City
- Burial place: Arlington National Cemetery
- Relatives: Emanuel Leutze (father)
- Military career
- Allegiance: United States of America
- Branch: United States Navy
- Service years: 1863–1912
- Rank: Rear admiral
- Commands: USS Alert; USS Monterey
- Conflicts: American Civil War; Spanish–American War

Eugene Henry Cozzens Leutze (16 November 1847 – 1 September 1931) was an admiral of the United States Navy.

== Biography ==
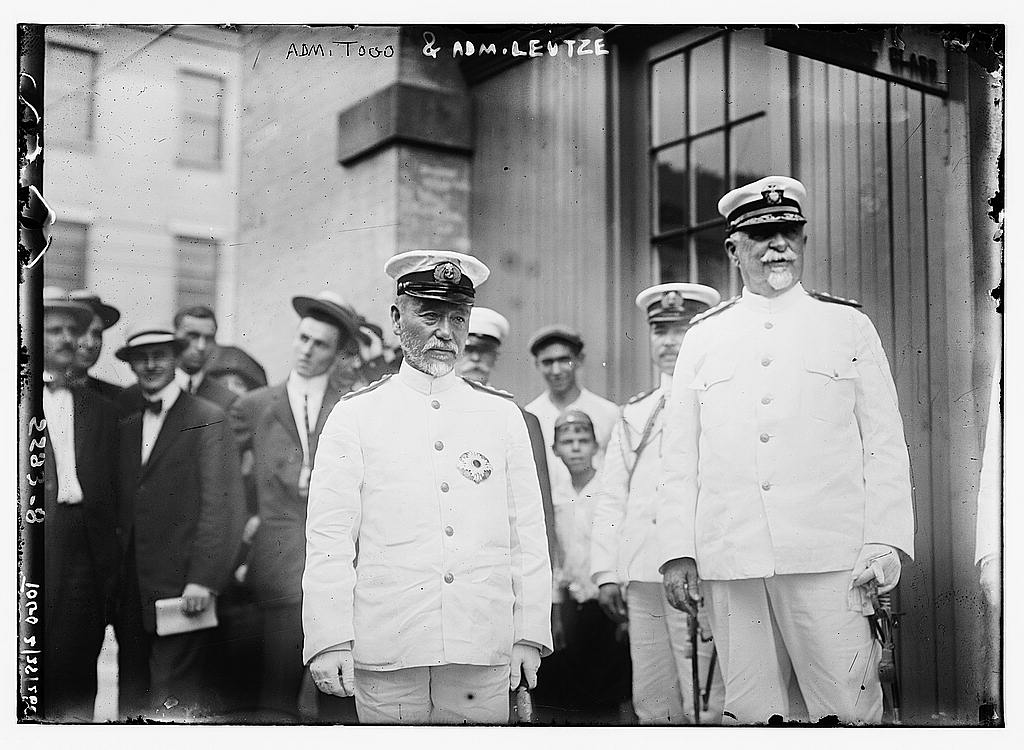
Tōgō Heihachirō and Leutze c. 1911

Leutze was born on 16 November 1847 (his father being Emanuel Leutze) in Düsseldorf, Prussia. Appointed to the United States Naval Academy by President Abraham Lincoln in 1863, he witnessed part of the Civil War on board the blockade ship Monticello the following summer.

His early career brought Leutze various surveying assignments, especially in Central America. In 1897, as commanding officer of Alert, he helped promote the peace when representatives from Costa Rica and Nicaragua met and signed a treaty of peace aboard his ship. As captain of Monterey during the Spanish–American War, he sailed to reinforce Admiral George Dewey's fleet at Manila, and was present when the city capitulated.

A fine administrator, he was promoted to rear admiral in 1907 while Superintendent of the Naval Gun Factory and Commandant of the Washington Navy Yard, Washington, D.C. Admiral Leutze ended his active career as Commandant of both the 3rd Naval District and the New York Navy Yard on 6 June 1912. He died at Brooklyn Naval Hospital on 1 September 1931.

He was interred at Arlington National Cemetery on 17 September 1931 sans "pomp and ritual" as per his request.

== Namesake ==
In 1942, the destroyer USS Leutze (DD-481) was named in his honor.

Leutze Park, the main parade ground at the Washington Navy Yard, is named in his honor. It is used for official change-of-command and retirement ceremonies.
