= CSS Jeff Davis (gunboat) =

History

Confederate States
- Name: Jeff Davis
- Namesake: Jefferson Davis
- Captured: By union forces, June 1862

General characteristics
- Armament: Unknown

Jeff Davis, a steam gunboat, was employed by the Confederates on the Ohio and Mississippi Rivers during the early years of the war. She was captured at Memphis by gunboats of the Mississippi Squadron in early June 1862, and later taken into Union service.
