= USS Marion =

Sloops-of-war of the United States Navy

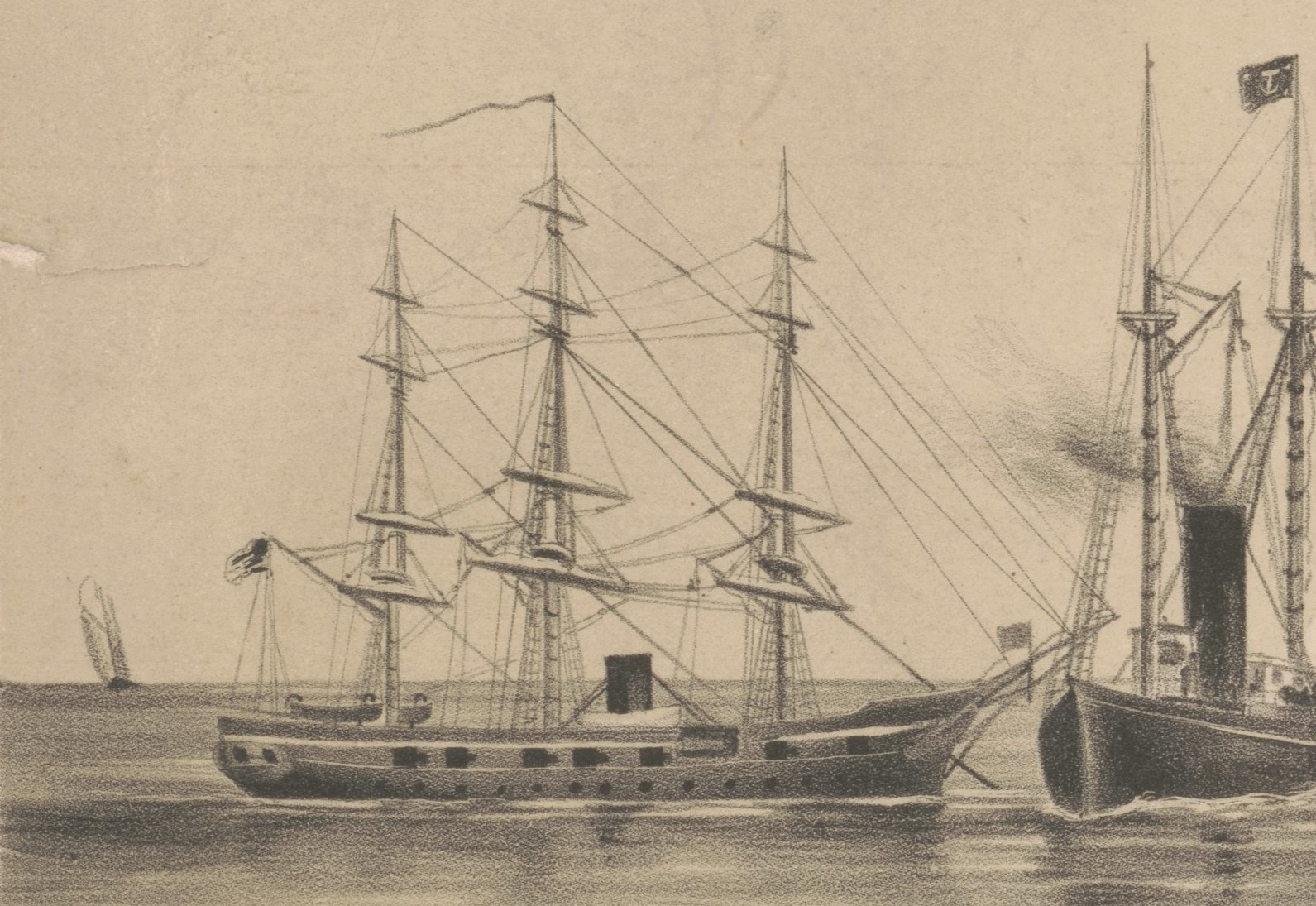
- Marion in 1880 at Hampton Roads

History

United States
- Name: USS Marion
- Builder: Boston Navy Yard
- Launched: 24 April 1839
- Commissioned: 11 December 1839
- Decommissioned: 1871
- Refit: Rebuilt as third-rate screw steamer
- Recommissioned: 12 January 1876
- Decommissioned: 11 December 1897
- Stricken: 14 March 1907
- Fate: Sold, 24 July 1907

General characteristics
- Type: Sloop-of-war
- Displacement: 566 long tons (575 t)
- Length: 117 ft (36 m)
- Beam: 32 ft (9.8 m)
- Draft: 15 ft 8 in (4.78 m)
- Propulsion: Sail
- Speed: 11 kts (under steam)
- Armament: 16 × 32-pounder guns Rebuilt: 1 × 11 in Dahlgren gun (on public display at St. Joseph, Michigan, US), 6 × 9 in Dahlgren guns, 1 × 60-pounder, 1 × 12 lb howitzer, 1 × Gatling gun

USS Marion was a sloop-of-war of the third rate in the Union Navy during the American Civil War launched at the Boston Navy Yard on 24 April 1839. On 10 November 1839, she departed Boston on her first cruise, to Brazil. Sunk when heaved down in the harbor at Rio de Janeiro early in 1842, she was raised and sailed back to Boston, arriving in May. She then set sail for the Caribbean, returning in May 1843. For the next few years, she remained in ordinary at Boston and then cruised off the West Coast of Africa and in the Mediterranean until 1848. She captured the Casket, a slaver, near Cabinda on 2 August 1846. After a tour in the East Indies from 1850 to 1852, she resumed operations with the African Squadron from 1853 to 1855 and 1858-60, capturing three more slaving ships: Brothers off Mayumba on 8 September 1858 and Orion and Ardennes in late April 1859 off the coast of Kongo. 1856-57 was spent in ordinary at Norfolk.

Marion was in ordinary service at Portsmouth, New Hampshire, when the Civil War broke out. She was recommissioned on 21 June 1861, and on 14 July sailed in search of the Confederate States of America cruiser CSS Jeff Davis. In September, she joined the Gulf Blockading Squadron, participating in the capture of Ship Island on the 16th. In March–April 1862, she was just off Apalachicola, Florida, in the West Pass when she was relieved by Mercedita.

In May 1862, Marion was ordered to Boston for repairs. Back in service by 24 July, she sailed south to Annapolis, Maryland, where she was employed as a practice ship for midshipmen until 1870. In 1871, she entered the Portsmouth Naval Shipyard, decommissioned and was rebuilt as a third-rate screw steamer.

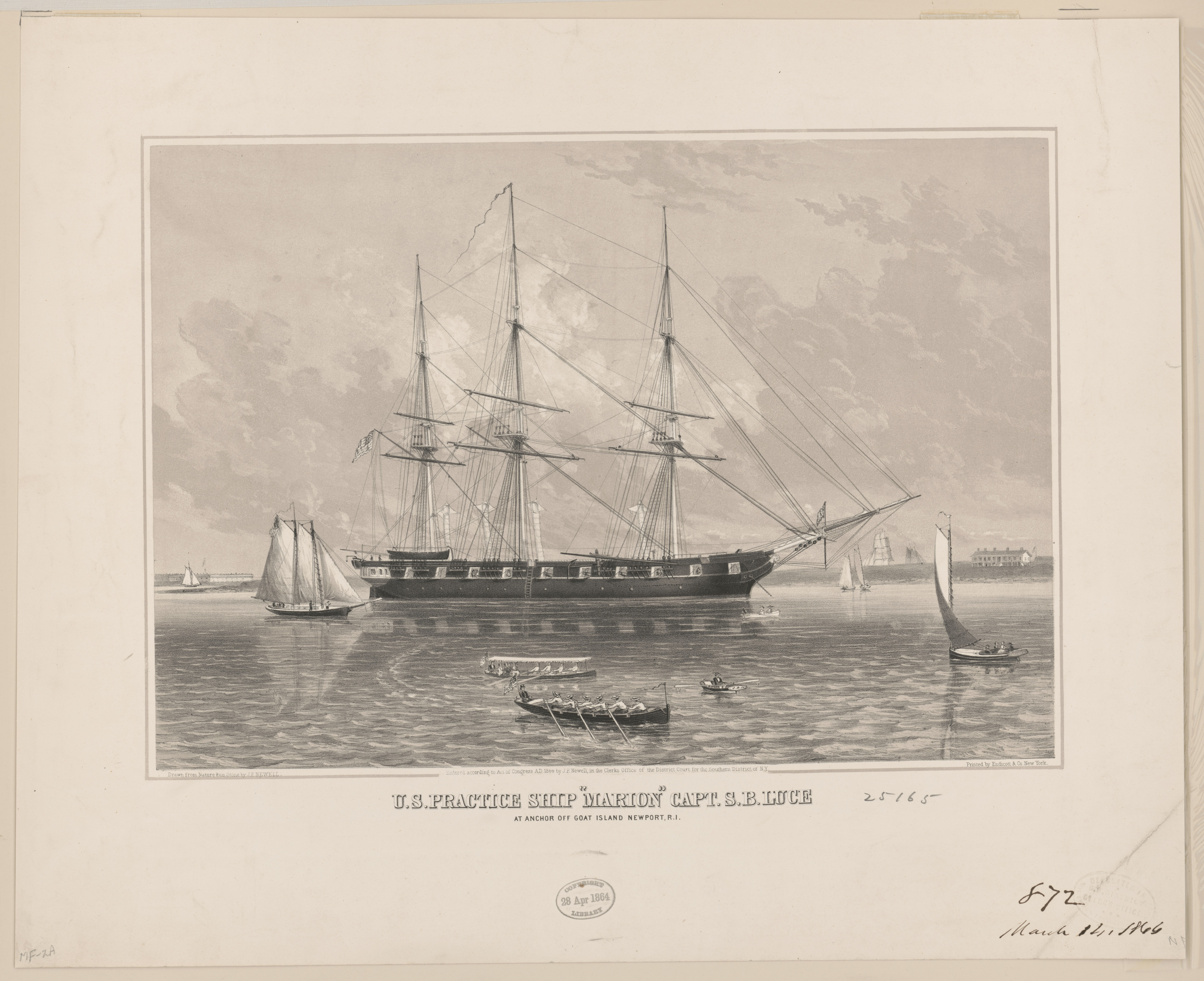
Practice ship Marion, Capt. S.B. Luce at anchor off Goat Island Newport, R.I before 1871

Recommissioned on 12 January 1876, she cruised on the European and South Atlantic Squadrons until December 1882, when she returned to Portsmouth. In 1885, she was ordered to the Pacific, where she was employed on the Asiatic Station until 1890. She then returned to the U.S., served briefly in the Bering Sea Squadron on duty connected with the seal fisheries, and, in late 1891, resumed operations with the Asiatic Squadron. Assigned to the Pacific Squadron in 1895, she cruised along the west coast of the Americas and amongst the Hawaiian Islands until 11 December 1897, when she decommissioned at Mare Island, California.

Subsequently, transferred to the custody of the State of California, she was employed as a training ship and headquarters for the California State Naval Militia. She was docked at San Francisco, California, pier No. 10 until 1907. On 14 March 1907, she was struck from the Naval Vessel Register and sold on 24 July to C. E. Boudrow, San Francisco.

The 11 inch Dahlgren from the Marion is now a Civil War Memorial in St. Joseph, Michigan. It is on masonry mounting and points west over Lake Michigan.

== See also ==
- List of sloops of war of the United States Navy
- Bibliography of early United States naval history
