= USS Nantucket (IX-18) =

Gunboat of the United States Navy

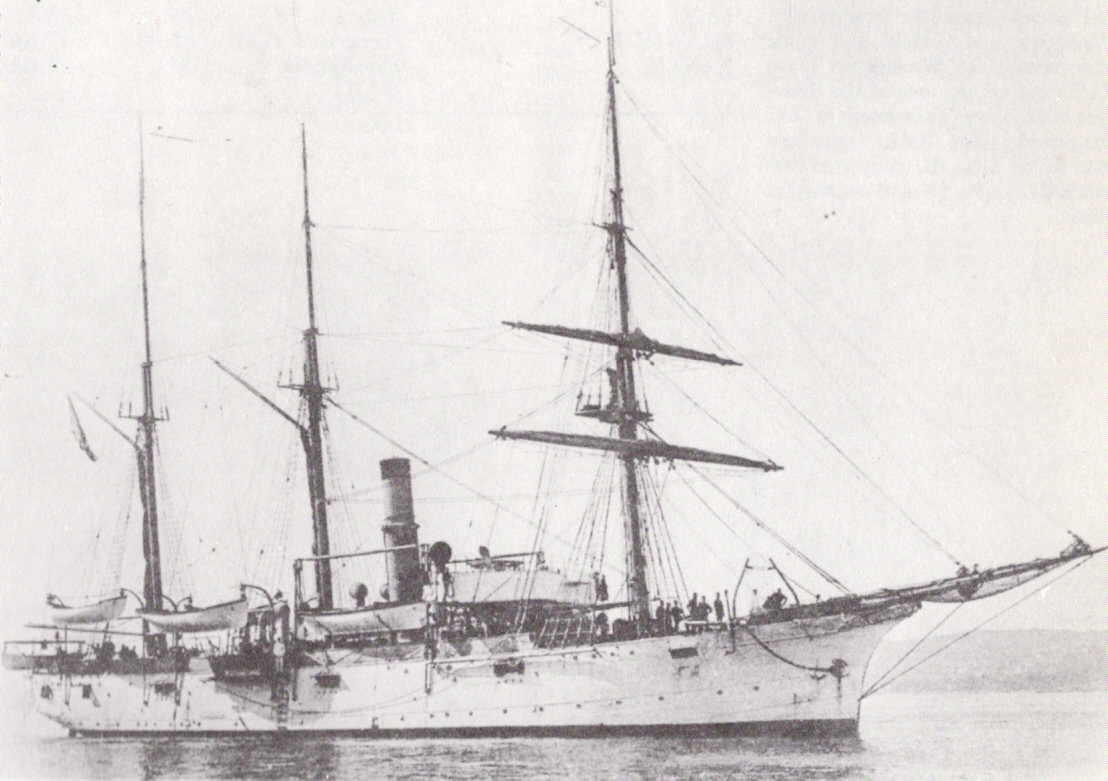
- USS Ranger at Algiers on 6 July 1913.

History

United States
- Name: Ranger
- Namesake: Ranger: One who wanders; a military scout; Rockport: The towns of Rockport, Indiana, Rockport, Maine, Rockport, Massachusetts, Rockport, Missouri, and Rockport, Texas.; Nantucket: Nantucket Island
- Builder: Harlan & Hollingsworth; engines by John Roach & Sons
- Laid down: 1873
- Renamed: Rockport (1917); Nantucket (1918)
- Reclassified: PG-23 (1920); IX-18 (1921)
- Commissioned: 27 Nov 1876—14 Sep 1891; 26 Aug 1892—26 Nov 1895; 1 Nov 1899—11 Jun 1903; 30 Mar 1905—21 Jun 1905; 10 Aug 1908—12 Nov 1908
- Stricken: 30 November 1940
- Fate: Transferred to Maritime Commission for final disposition 11 November 1940; Scrapped 1958

General characteristics
- Class & type: Alert class gunboat
- Displacement: 1,020
- Length: 177 ft 4 in
- Beam: 32 ft
- Draft: 12 ft 9 in
- Installed power: 1 × 560 ihp, 64 rpm compound back-acting steam engine
- Propulsion: 1 × 12 ft diameter × 17.5 ft pitch propeller, auxiliary sails
- Speed: 10 knots under steam
- Complement: 138 officers and enlisted
- Armament: 1 × 11" smoothbore; 2 × 9" smoothbore; 1 × 60-pounder

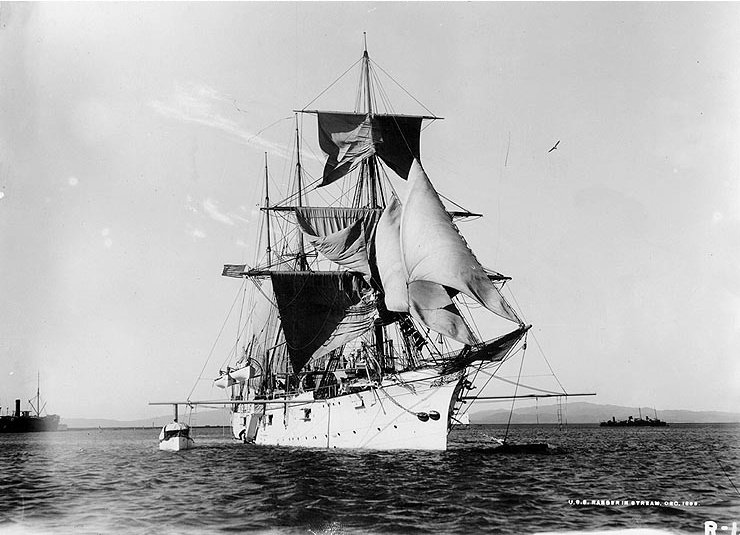
USS Ranger drying sails while moored off Mare Island Navy Yard, Vallejo, California, in December 1899.

USS Ranger, later USS Rockport and USS Nantucket (PG-23/IX-18), was a gunboat of the United States Navy. A screw steamer with full-rig auxiliary sail, Ranger was destined for a very long 65-year career, serving first as a U.S. Navy gunboat from 1876 to 1920, and later as a training ship with the Massachusetts Maritime Academy from 1909 to 1941.

The ship was finally scrapped in 1958, but her engine, which is the only one of its type known to be still in existence, was preserved and is on display at the American Merchant Marine Museum of Kings Point, New York.

== Design and construction ==
Ranger was built by Harlan and Hollingsworth of Wilmington, Delaware. She was laid down in 1873, and launched in 1876.

Ranger's engine was designed by the Bureau of Steam Engineering and built by John Roach & Sons of Chester, Pennsylvania. The engine is of the compound back-acting type, with cylinders of 28½ and 42½ inches respectively, and a 42-inch stroke. The pistons, cylinder liners and bearings are constructed of bronze. At 64 rpm, the 560 ihp engine drove the ship at a speed of 10 knots. Four coal-burning Scotch boilers supplied steam at a pressure of 80 psi.

== Service history ==
Ranger was commissioned at League Island Naval Shipyard, Philadelphia, Pennsylvania, 27 November 1876. After completion of fitting out, Ranger was assigned to the Atlantic Station, but remained in the Gosport (Portsmouth) Navy Yard and Hampton Roads until 8 March 1877, when she was assigned to the Asiatic Fleet. Following a special fitting out for her new duty, Ranger left New York City 21 May 1877, arriving Hong Kong 24 August 1877, via Gibraltar, Suez Canal, and Malacca Straits. The ship served on the Asiatic Station until the fall of 1879, protecting American interests and national policy in the Far East.

Arriving at Mare Island Navy Yard 24 February 1880, she was converted into a survey vessel. From 1881 to 1889, she was engaged in hydrographic survey work off Mexico, Baja California, Central America, and the northern Pacific; except when protecting American national interests in the politically turbulent Central American nations. On 12 October 1885 one of her boats was almost run over by steamer Modoc (United States) off Mare Island, some of the 10 crewmen aboard jumped overboard and one drowned. While off Ensenada, Mexico, on 18 January 1886, Landsman John Enright rescued two shipmates from drowning, for which he was awarded the Medal of Honor.

In 1890, Ranger, now commanded by Commander George Cook Reiter, became nationally known as the result of the Barrundia Affair. Reiter was the senior U.S. naval officer present at the port of San José de Guatemala during the attempted arrest of General J. Martín Barrundia, a rebel Guatemalan general who had unsuccessfully attempted to take over the government during a military insurrection, and was forced into exile by the Guatemalan government. Barrundia had boarded the SS Acapulco, an American-flag ship, and requested political asylum in the United States, when the ship stopped at a Guatemalan port. Rather than place a guard on the SS Acapulco for General Barrundia or offer him political asylum, Reiter delayed the General's asylum request several hours in order to gain the permission of the Guatemalan government, which never came. The SS Acapulco was later boarded by Guatemalan officers, and Barrundia killed while resisting arrest in a gunfight aboard the SS Acapulco. During the occupation of the ship, the U.S. flag was taken down, arms and supplies were seized, and the Guatemalan flag was raised in its place. The Secretary of the Navy, at the personal direction of President Benjamin Harrison, ordered Lt. Commander Reiter's conduct to be investigated; the Secretary later censured Reiter and relieved him of command.

Ranger was decommissioned from 14 September 1891 to 26 August 1892 at Mare Island Navy Yard.

Upon reactivation, she was assigned to protect American seal fisheries with the Bering Sea Squadron in 1891. On 31 January 1894, she relieved Alliance in protecting American interests in Central America, where she remained until placed out of commission 26 November 1895, except for temporary duty in the Bering Sea in May 1894.

Recommissioned 1 November 1899, she was a survey ship for two years off Mexico and Baja California, then operated with USS Wisconsin (BB-9) off Central America, protecting American national interests. She was again decommissioned from 11 June 1903 to 30 March 1905 at Puget Sound Naval Shipyard.

She departed Puget Sound 16 April 1905, for the Asiatic Station, arriving Cavite 30 May. Due to recurring maintenance problems, she was decommissioned again at Cavite from 21 June 1905 to 10 August 1908. Departing Cavite 16 August, she arrived Boston 12 December via the Suez Canal, and was decommissioned immediately on 10 November 1908. On 26 April 1909, she was loaned to the Commonwealth of Massachusetts as a school ship to replace Enterprise at the Massachusetts Nautical Training School.

Her name was changed to Rockport 30 October 1917 and then to Nantucket 20 February 1918. As Nantucket, she operated as a gunboat in the First Naval District during World War I, as well as a training ship for Navy midshipmen.

On 15 January 1919, Nantucket and her crew were some of the first rescuers to arrive on the scene of the Great Molasses Flood in Boston’s North End neighborhood. Sailors from Nantucket were credited with rescuing multiple victims who were swept into Boston Harbor by the molasses, and many went ashore to aid in further rescue efforts.

Designated PG-23 in 1920, Nantucket was redesignated IX-18 on 1 July 1921. On 11 November 1940, she was transferred to the Maritime Commission for final disposition, to be used as a school ship for the Merchant Marine Academy, Kings Point, N.Y. On 30 November 1940, she was struck from the Navy list and was returned to the state of Massachusetts as a school ship.

In 1942, she was returned to the US Merchant Marine Academy, renamed TV Emery Rice, and used once more as a training ship. She was retired in 1944 and subsequently served as a museum ship until being scrapped in 1958.

Though the ship itself was scrapped, the engine—the only back-acting type known to be still in existence—was saved from destruction by the efforts of Admiral Richard R. McNulty. The engine, which weighs 61 tons and has dimensions of 20 × 10 ft × 6 ft high, now features as the centerpiece of a display at the American Merchant Marine Museum in Kings Point, New York.
