= USS Mohican (1883) =

Sloops-of-war of the United States Navy

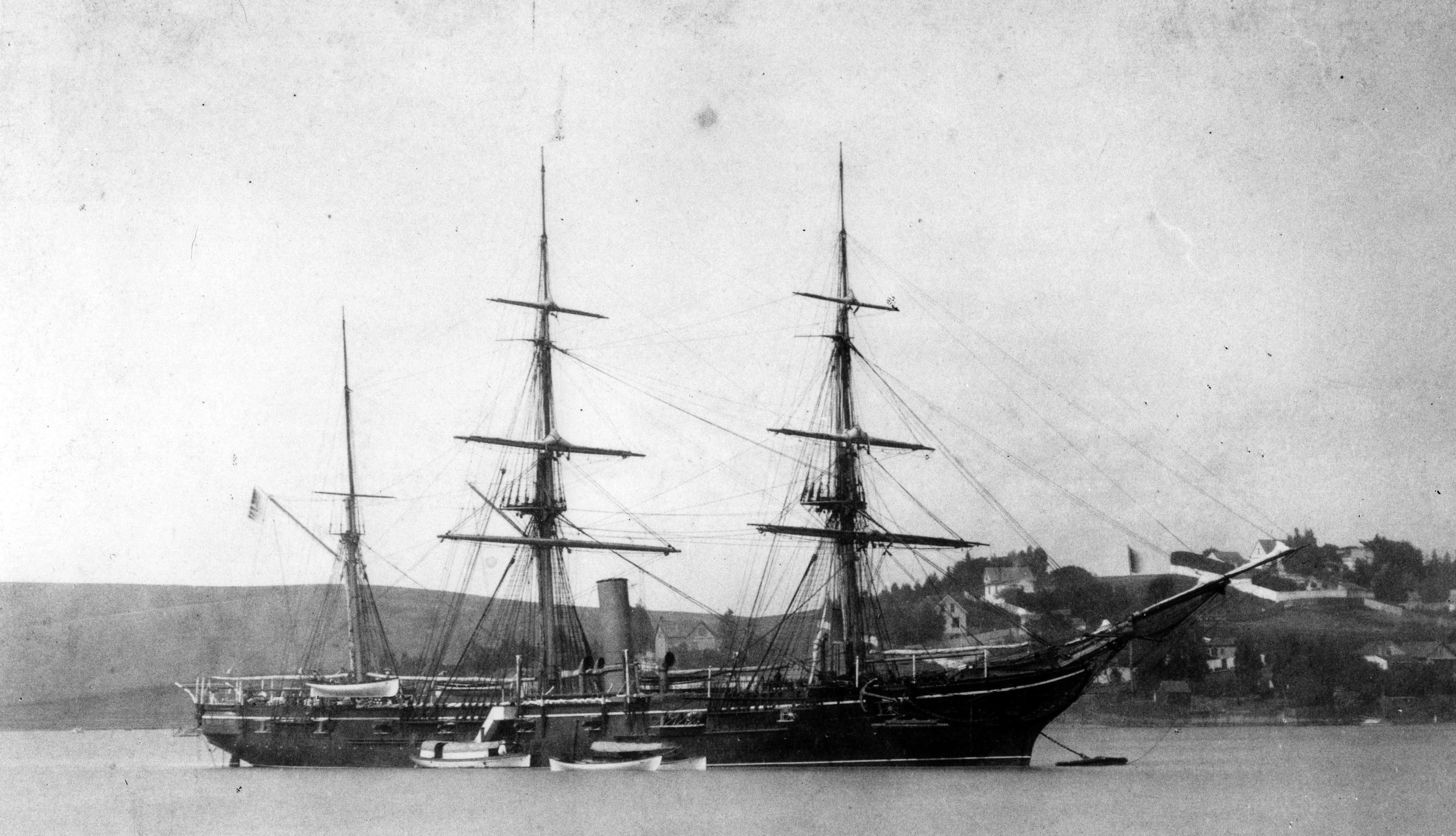

History

United States
- Name: USS Mohican
- Builder: Mare Island Navy Yard
- Laid down: 4 September 1872
- Launched: 27 December 1883
- Commissioned: 25 May 1885
- Decommissioned: 21 October 1921
- Fate: Sold, 4 March 1922

General characteristics
- Type: Steam Sloop-of-war
- Displacement: 1,900 long tons (1,930 t)
- Length: 216 ft (66 m) p/p
- Beam: 37 ft (11 m)
- Draft: 17 ft 6 in (5.33 m)
- Speed: 10.65 knots (19.72 km/h; 12.26 mph)
- Complement: 230
- Armament: 1 × 8 in (200 mm) gun; 8 × 9 in (230 mm) guns; 1 × 60-pounder gun

The second USS Mohican was a steam sloop of war in the United States Navy. She was named for the Mohican tribe.

== Construction ==
Mohican was laid down by Mare Island Navy Yard, California, 4 September 1872, funded with the repair money allocated for the first Mohican; launched 27 December 1883; sponsored by Miss Eleanor W. Much; and commissioned 25 May 1885, Commander Benjamin F. Day in command.

== Service history ==
=== First Cruise ===
Assigned to the Pacific Squadron, Mohican departed San Francisco, California 27 June 1885 to patrol the coast of Mexico and South America. Steaming as far south as Callao, Peru, the sloop of war spent the winter at that port and then departed 6 March 1886 for the South Pacific. For the remainder of the year, the warship cruised in tropical waters, visiting the Marquesas, Tahiti, and the Tuamotu Archipelago, and patrolling Samoan waters to protect American interests from German political interference. In July she paid an official call in Auckland, New Zealand. She surveyed Easter Island in December for the Smithsonian Institution, and then sailed on the 31st for South America, arriving Valparaíso, Chile, 14 January 1887.

Mohican operated off the South American coast until sailing from Callao for Honolulu 10 September, and then following protocol activities and patrol in the islands through January 1888 cruised in the South Pacific until returning to Mare Island via Honolulu 1 August. The warship underwent an 11-month overhaul and then returned to Polynesian waters to patrol, in addition visiting Sydney, Australia, and Auckland. After a year-and-a-half cruise, she returned to San Francisco 9 April 1891.

=== Second Cruise ===
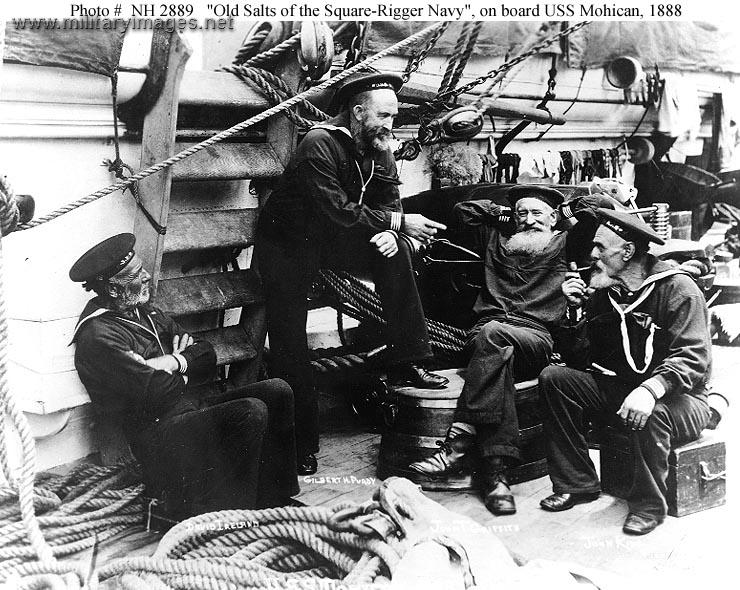
Sailors on USS Mohican in 1888.

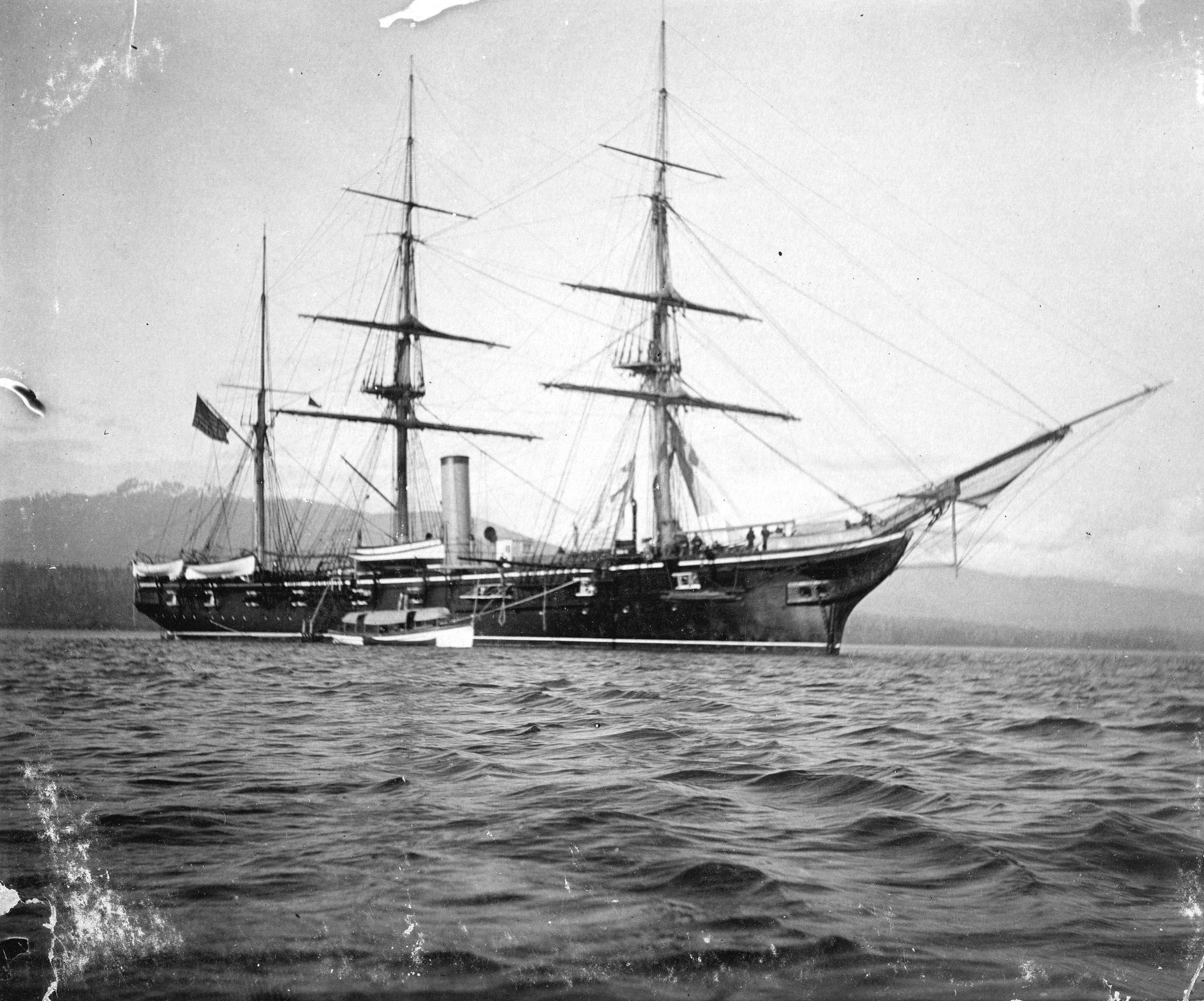
Mohican visiting Vancouver, British Columbia.

Two months later, 19 June, Mohican stood out to assist the short lived Bering Sea Squadron in anti-poaching operations by protecting the sealing plants and fisheries from trouble Mohican remained in northern waters until 19 October 1892. While returning to San Francisco, Mohican twice ran aground and required repair of her keel and boilers. A court of inquiry, which included Captains Benjamin F. Day and Alfred Thayer Mahan, was conducted in December to try its captain, Commander H. L. Johnson for the matter. Commander Johnson was acquitted.

=== Third Cruise ===
After completion of repairs in January 1893, Mohican was outfitted as flagship for Rear Admiral Joseph S. Skerrett, commander of the Pacific Squadron. Following the overthrow of Hawaii 's last reigning monarch, Queen Liliuokalani, on 17 January 1893, Skerrett and his new flagship, Mohican were ordered to depart for Honolulu on 29 January 1893. With a new Hawaiian provisional government established, Mohican returned to San Francisco in May 1893. She subsequently sailed in June for Alaska to continue her Bering Sea patrols, ending a 22-month cruise at San Francisco 8 October 1894. The ship remained on the Pacific coast, visiting ports in the Northwest and patrolling. On 13 August 1895, during his around the world tour, Samuel Clemens and his family dined aboard at the invitation of Mohican's Executive Officer, Lieutenant Commander Albion Wadhams, described as an old acquaintance of Clemens. Mohican was decommissioned at Mare Island 16 September 1895.

=== Fourth Cruise ===
Mohican was recommissioned 8 February 1898 because of imminent danger of war with Spain. She then made two voyages to Hawaii to protect American interests, March to May and June to September. Following the end of the Spanish–American War, she was assigned duty as a school ship for landsmen at Mare Island. The venerable sloop cruised the Pacific coast into 1902 and then in January 1903 sailed across the Pacific, steaming via Honolulu, Christmas Island, Samoa, and Guam to Yokohama, Japan, on a goodwill visit. She returned to Mare Island in August following stops at Honolulu and Dutch Harbor, Unalaska, and then resumed cruising the Californian and Mexican coasts. On 8 April 1904, the ship was assigned as station ship at the Naval Station, Olongapo, Subic Bay, Luzon, Philippines, and 1 month later sailed via Honolulu, Guam, and Cavite for her new station, arriving 4 February 1905.

=== As tender ===
Mohican served as station ship into 1910, being ordered to additional service as tender for submarine divisions, Asiatic Fleet, 30 December 1909. The veteran warship steamed to Cavite 30 March 1910 for duty as submarine tender there and three years later 17 March 1913 was designated receiving ship at Cavite and stationary tender, 1st Submarine Group, Torpedo Flotilla, Asiatic Fleet. Though relieved of this duty by monitor Monadnock 27 June 1914, she continued her tending duties through the end of 1915.

== Decommissioned ==
Mohican decommissioned at Cavite 21 October 1921 and was sold 4 March 1922 to A. E. Haley of Manila.

== Awards ==
- Spanish Campaign Medal
- World War I Victory Medal
