= USS Alert (AS-4) =

Iron-hulled screw steamer gunboat in the United States Navy

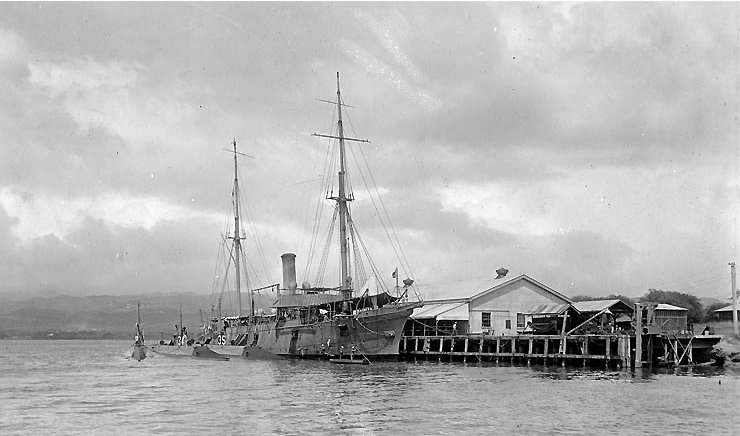
- Alert, serving as tender for the Third Submarine Division of the Pacific Fleet, lying alongside the wharf at Kuahua Island, U.S. Naval Station, Pearl Harbor, 22 August 1917. K-3 and K-4 are identifiable alongside; the unidentified "boat" is probably K-8.

History
- Name: USS Alert
- Builder: John Roach & Sons
- Laid down: 1873
- Launched: 18 September 1874
- Commissioned: 27 May 1875
- Decommissioned: 9 March 1922
- Fate: Sold 29 July 1922

General characteristics
- Class & type: Alert-class gunboat
- Displacement: 1,020 long tons (1,040 t)
- Length: 199 ft 9 in (60.88 m)
- Beam: 32 ft (9.8 m)
- Draft: 13 ft (4.0 m)
- Speed: 10 kn (12 mph; 19 km/h)
- Complement: 202 officers and enlisted
- Armament: 1 × 11 in (280 mm) smoothbore, 2 × 9 in (230 mm) smoothbore, 1 × 60-pounder rifled, Spar torpedoes

The third USS Alert was an iron-hulled screw steamer gunboat in the United States Navy. The lead ship in her class, Alert was destined for a long naval career, serving from 1875 to 1922, a period of 47 years, including service as a submarine tender in World War I. Toward the end of her career she received the designation AS-4.

Alert was laid down in 1873 by John Roach & Sons at the Delaware River Iron Ship Building and Engine Works shipyard, Chester, Pennsylvania in 1873. Launched on 18 September 1874, Alert was commissioned for the first time on 27 May 1875 with Commander William T. Sampson in command.

== Service history ==
=== First commission, 1875–82 ===
==== Training ship ====
The screw steamer spent the first year of her Navy career attached to the North Atlantic Station. During the summer, she wore the flag of Rear Admiral C. R. Perry Rodgers, Superintendent of the Naval Academy, and hosted cadet-midshipmen on board for practical training in the operation of steam propulsion equipment – all as a part of the Academy's practice cruise for 1875.

==== Atlantic and Asiatic stations ====
Alert operated out of ports on the Atlantic coast during the fall and winter of 1875 and 1876 until departing New York on 26 May 1876 on the first leg of a voyage to the Asiatic Station. Proceeding by way of the Mediterranean Sea and the relatively new Suez Canal, she stopped at Gibraltar, Malta, and Aden before reaching Hong Kong on 11 September. For almost three years, the ship cruised the waters around Japan and along the Chinese coast, showing the flag at such places as Yokohama, Nagasaki, Kobe, and Hakodate in Japan, and Hong Kong, Shanghai, Amoy, and Swatow in China. Unlike modern goodwill visits, her port calls frequently could be measured in terms of weeks and months rather than days. When at sea, she charted hydrographic features, investigated maritime disasters, and performed humanitarian services for the victims of those disasters.

On 4 January 1879, Alert departed Yokohama on her way back to the United States. She arrived at the Mare Island Navy Yard on 24 February and began a six-month repair period. On 30 August 1879, the warship set sail from San Francisco on her way back to the Asiatic Station. The steamer arrived in Yokohama on 6 October and commenced 32 months of service in the Far East. In addition to the normal port visits and wreck investigations, she did survey work in the Bonin Islands during the spring and summer of 1881. On 11 January 1882, Alert stood out of Hong Kong and embarked upon a voyage that took her to a number of places in the Orient that she had not previously visited. Her itinerary during that cruise included Saigon, Bangkok, and Singapore in southeast Asia; Batavia (now Djakarta) and Sarawak in the Netherlands East Indies (now Indonesia); and Labuan, Iloilo and Manila in the Philippines.

==== Collision with Japanese Emperor's yacht ====
She returned to Japan via Hong Kong, and, on 15 April 1882, while steaming from Kobe to Yokohama, suffered damage as a result of being rammed by the Jingei, a side-paddle steamer which served as the Imperial yacht for Emperor Meiji. Although the night was clear and both vessels had their running lights in sight of each other for an hour, Jingei inexplicably turned hard to starboard just as the vessels passed each other, gashing a large hole in the side of the Alert. Jingei suffered only minor damage, but Alert took two months to complete repairs. On 15 June, the ship left Yokohama again for the United States. She arrived in San Francisco on 18 July, and on the 31st she was placed out of commission at Mare Island.

=== Asiatic station, 1883-86 ===
The warship remained inactive at Mare Island until recommissioned on 8 October 1883 for another tour of duty on the Asiatic Station. On 23 November, she put to sea on the long voyage to the Orient. She arrived in Nagasaki, Japan, on 18 February 1884 and spent the next 20 months operating almost exclusively in the East China Sea and the Yellow Sea, calling frequently at Nagasaki and at Chemulpo (now Inchon), Korea. Alert widened her horizons in the fall of 1885 with more frequent visits to Chinese ports; and, during the early months of 1886, extended her range still farther to include southeast Asian ports, notably Bangkok and Singapore. In March 1886, she stopped at Hong Kong and Canton. On 19 April, the warship returned to Japan at Yokohama. That port and Hakodate served as the foci of her operations until the first week in August. Alert put to sea from the latter on 5 August, beginning a voyage back to the United States. She entered San Francisco on 10 September and went out of commission there on 23 September.

=== Pacific station, 1887–90 ===
Recommissioned at the Mare Island Navy Yard on 15 January 1887, for service on the Pacific Squadron, the warship departed San Francisco on 23 February and headed down the coast of Mexico toward Central and South America. She arrived off the coast of Panama – then still a province of Colombia – on 7 May. For the next 15 months, Alert plied the waters along the west coast of Central and South America between Panama and Peru. On 11 August 1888, she set sail from Callao, Peru, bound for Hawaii – then still an independent kingdom but heavily influenced by American residents. Alert arrived in Honolulu on 15 September and remained in the islands until the spring of 1889. Sermons given on board by Rear Admiral Albert Ross in 1887 and 1888 are extant.

==== Samoan mercy mission ====
The ship's departure from Hawaii came in response to a maritime disaster at Samoa. Diplomatic relations strained by efforts to achieve political dominance in Samoa had brought together in Apia, Samoa, seven warships belonging to three nations. The naval strength gathered there consisted of the American ships Nipsic, Trenton, and Vandalia; the Germans SMS Adler, SMS Eber, and SMS 0–90; and the lone British man-of-war HMS Calliope. On 15 March 1889, a hurricane struck Apia trapping the three American and three German warships in the harbor. Only HMS Calliope succeeded in escaping to sea early on the 16th. By the morning of the 16th, the storm increased in ferocity and battered the six remaining vessels unmercifully. All three German ships sank, as did Trenton and Vandalia. Nipsic, though severely damaged, managed to beach and survive the storm.

Alert left Honolulu on 18 April and set a course for Samoa to provide assistance and to escort Nipsic to a repair facility. She reached Apia on 3 May and remained there six days. On 9 May, she stood out of Apia with Nipsic bound for Auckland, New Zealand, but heavy seas forced the two warships back to Apia. From there, they moved to Pago Pago, whence they departed on the 31st. Alert left Nipsic at Fanning Island on 14 June and continued on alone to Honolulu. She returned a month later, and the two warships put to sea for the last leg of the voyage to Honolulu where they arrived on 2 August.

The steamer remained in the Hawaiian Islands until she set sail for the United States on 21 November. She arrived in San Francisco on 9 December and was decommissioned at the Mare Island Navy Yard on 6 February 1890.

=== Various stations, 1890–93 ===
Alert remained there, inactive, until recommissioned on 9 October 1890, Cdr. R. D. Hitchcock in command. She served initially on the Pacific Squadron, but departed Mare Island on 18 June 1891 for a summer of duty with the Bering Sea Squadron discouraging seal poachers before continuing on to permanent duty on the Asiatic Station. The warship left Unalaska on 22 August and arrived in Yokohama on 10 September. She spent the next two years cruising the waters along the Japanese, Korean, and Chinese coasts and visiting most of the major ports in the area. As in the past, her primary missions consisted of keeping an eye on American interests and showing the flag.

In the summer of 1893, orders arrived sending the ship back to the United States. She departed Yokohama on 15 August; arrived in San Francisco on 21 September; and, two days later, was placed out of commission at the Mare Island Navy Yard.

=== Pacific station, 1894–98 ===
On 2 April 1894, Alert was recommissioned, Cdr. W. A. Morgan in command. Assigned to the Pacific Squadron once again, she returned to the Bering Sea late in May for a summer of duty suppressing seal poachers. The warship finished that assignment in mid-September and arrived back at San Francisco on the 27th. The following day, she moved to the Mare Island Navy Yard and remained there through the end of the year. On 24 January 1895, Alert, departed Mare Island to take up duty off the Pacific coasts of Central and South America. Proceeding via San Diego and Acapulco, she reached Puerto San José on 15 February. The vessel cruised along the Latin American littoral between Guatemala and Peru for over 16 months keeping watch over U.S. interests in the region. On 2 June 1896, she departed La Libertad, Salvador (now El Salvador), to return home. After stops at several Mexican ports and at San Diego, she reached San Francisco on 17 July.

The steamer remained in the San Francisco Bay area almost two months, spending about half that time at the Mare Island Navy Yard. From 10 September-10 October, she made a round-trip cruise to Port Angeles, Washington. On 18 November, she stood out of San Francisco Bay on her way to conduct drills and gunnery exercises in the Hawaiian Islands. The warship arrived in Honolulu on 9 December and remained in the islands through most of the first three months of 1897. On 22 March 1897, she left Honolulu, set a course for California, and reentered San Francisco harbor on 4 April. After almost two months at San Francisco—five weeks of which were spent at the Mare Island Navy Yard—she embarked upon a voyage to Sitka, Alaska, and back.

The ship returned to San Francisco on 13 July and commenced a two-month sojourn there. On 18 September, she headed back down the west coast to Central American waters and operated off the coast of Guatemala from 4 October-6 November before heading back to San Francisco. Alert arrived there on 29 November and did not put to sea again until sailing for Nicaraguan waters on 8 January 1898. She patrolled the Pacific coast of Nicaragua for almost four months before heading north once more on 29 April. Alert reached San Francisco on 21 May, moved to the Mare Island Navy Yard on the 23d, and was decommissioned there on 4 June 1898.

=== Training ship, 1901–1907 ===
Following nearly three years of inactivity, the veteran steamer was recommissioned on 11 May 1901, Cdr. Gottfried Blocklinger in command and was assigned to the Pacific Station as a training vessel for apprentice sailors. In that capacity, she made short cruises along the California coast until decommissioned again on 10 December 1903. She was berthed in the Mare Island Navy Yard until transferred on loan to the California Naval Militia sometime early in 1907.

=== Submarine tender, 1910–1922 ===
Although returned to the Navy on 27 February 1910, Alert was not reactivated until almost two years later. On 25 January 1912, she was placed in commission, in reserve, Lieutenant Charles E. Smith in command, in connection with her fitting out for service as a submarine tender. She was placed in full commission on 1 July 1912, Lt. Charles E. Smith still in command.

Alert tended submarines for the Torpedo Flotilla, Pacific Fleet, at both Naval Submarine Base Pearl Harbor and San Pedro Submarine Base until late in 1917. In executing her new duties, she made short voyages along the California coast in much the same manner as she had done while serving as an apprentice training vessel.

==== World War I and after ====
The entry of the United States into World War I necessitated an increase of American naval strength in the Atlantic. Thus, in December 1917, the ship steamed south from San Diego, transited the Panama Canal, and proceeded to Bermuda where she took up duty as base and repair ship.

In April 1918, Alert returned to the west coast and resumed duties as a Pacific Fleet Torpedo Flotilla submarine tender based at San Pedro, California. That assignment occupied her for the remaining four years of her naval career. When the Navy adopted the alphanumeric system of hull designations on 17 July 1920, she was classified AS-4.

=== Final decommission ===
On 9 March 1922, Alert was placed out of commission at the Mare Island Navy Yard. She was sold to A. Bercovich Company, Oakland, California, on 29 July.
