= George Henry Ellis =

United States Navy sailor (1875–1898)

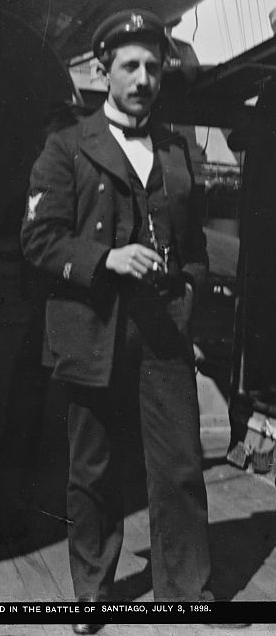
Chief Yeoman George H. Ellis in dress uniform aboard USS Brooklyn shortly before his death on 3 July 1898

George Henry Ellis (26 October 1875 – 3 July 1898) was a sailor in the United States Navy during the Spanish–American War. He was the only US sailor killed in action during the Battle of Santiago de Cuba.

== Early life and career ==
Ellis was born in Peoria, Illinois. At an early age he and his mother moved to New York City, and later to Brooklyn, New York. He enlisted in the Navy on 26 February 1892 as apprentice, third class. On 25 October 1896 he was honorably discharged with a rate of apprentice, first class. Ellis re-enlisted on 3 May 1897 as a seaman, and was later assigned to the USS Dolphin as a Yeoman 1st Class. He was transferred to the armored cruiser USS Brooklyn, and was promoted to Chief Yeoman on 1 February 1898. Aboard the Brooklyn, Ellis served as Captain Francis Cook's clerk.

== Battle of Santiago de Cuba ==
Ellis was killed 3 July 1898 while serving on the Brooklyn during the Battle of Santiago de Cuba. That day Ellis reported to his battle station on the forecastle to operate the stadimeter, a range-finding device for the naval guns. Chief Yeoman Ellis was considered an expert with the device. Ellis' target ranges were relayed by messenger to the gun crews. It was reported later that Ellis would stand on the foc's'le with a watch in one hand and the stadimeter in the other. He was completely exposed to enemy shell fire, as the observer's position was unprotected. As the Brooklyn was Commodore Winfield Scott Schley's flagship of his Flying Squadron, it came under heavy fire from Spanish ships during the battle. The Brooklyn was struck twenty times.

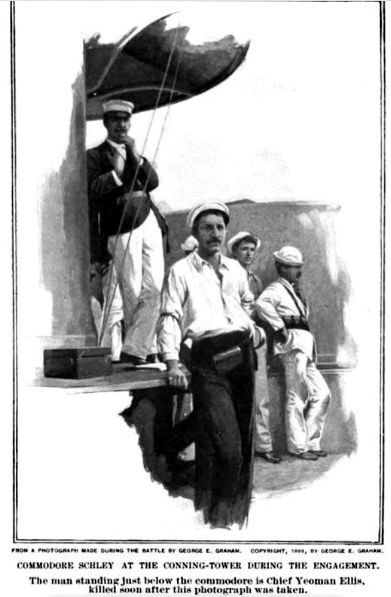
Commodore Winfield Scott Schley and Chief Yeoman George H. Ellis on the USS Brooklyn shortly before Ellis' death

As the Brooklyn was pursuing the Vizcaya and Cristóbal Colón, Ellis was monitoring the distance between the Brooklyn and the fleeing Spanish ships, and returning to Schley in person to report the distance. Schley thought the Spanish ships were gaining, so he ordered Ellis to take another range. As Ellis returned once again to the forward turret to find the range, a shell hit him in the face and decapitated him. Schley was standing about 8–10 feet (2–3 m) behind Ellis. Blood was spraying everywhere. Following standard procedure, Ensign McCauley and Doctor Du Valin were preparing to toss the body overboard, when Commodore Schley shouted "No! Do not throw that body overboard!" Ellis' body was covered with a blanket and placed behind the turret. After the battle, Ellis was laid to rest at Camp McCalla, beside the marines who had fallen at the Battle of Guantánamo Bay. Chief Yeoman George Ellis was the only KIA (Killed In Action) of the Battle of Santiago de Cuba.

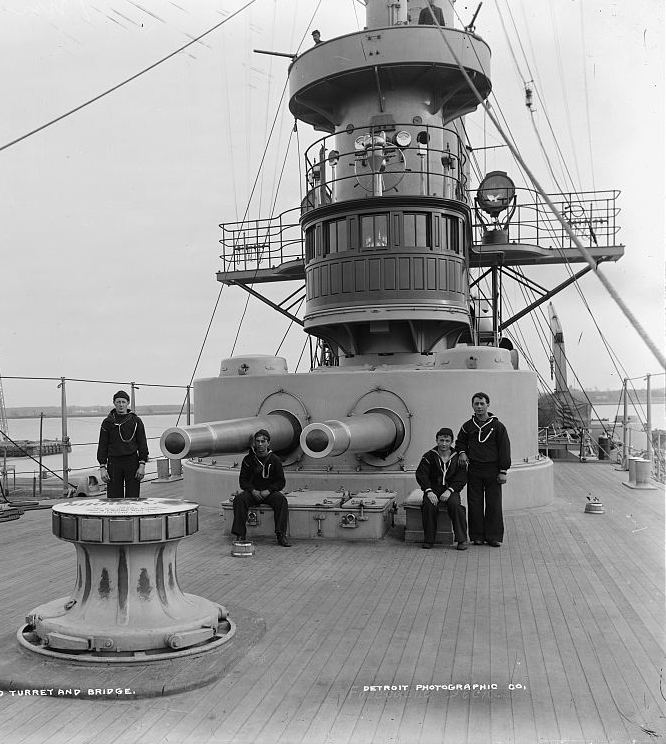
USS Brooklyn - Forward turret and bridge area of the forecastle where Ellis was killed (1898)

During October, a memorial service was held at Washington Avenue Baptist Church in Brooklyn. The church was filled to capacity with 2,000 mourners, and thousands more were turned away. Speakers at the service included Commodore Jack Philip of the USS Texas, Captain Cook of the Brooklyn, New York Lieutenant Governor Timothy Woodruff, and former mayor Charles Schieren. A telegram of condolence from Secretary of the Navy John Long was read.

Soon after the battle, the officers and men of the Brooklyn started a collection to benefit Ellis's widow, Sadie, and their seven-month old infant. By September 1898, $2000 had been raised. In January 1899, Sadie began receiving a pension from the US government.

Ellis was later re-buried at Cemetery of the Evergreens in Brooklyn, New York, on 28 November 1898.

== Legacy ==
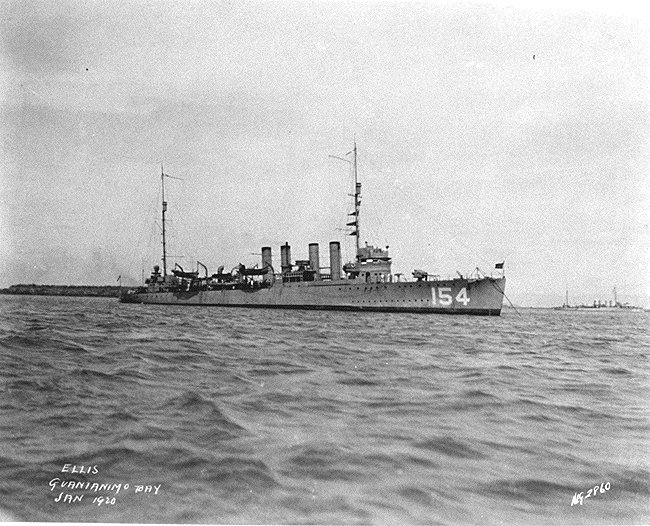
USS Ellis at anchor in Guantánamo Bay in January 1920

George Ellis was a prominent character in a fictional account of the battle published in 1899, Fighting in Cuban waters, or under Schley on the Brooklyn by Edward Stratemeyer and A. B.Shute.

In 1908, the death of Ellis and the destruction of his stadimeter were cited in an article in the United States Naval Institute Proceedings. The article addressed the impracticality of using observers aloft or in an exposed position on deck to determine range to targets during an actual battle. The proposed improvement was to install the range-finder in an armored installation on each gun turret.

The destroyer USS Ellis (DD-154) was named in his honor. Launched on 30 November 1918 and commissioned on 7 June 1919, Ellis' maiden voyage was to the Black Sea. She transported US Food Administration officials for famine relief work. During 1920, she participated in exercises along the US East Coast and in the Caribbean Sea. In January 1920, she was anchored in Guantánamo Bay, about 10 miles (16 km) from the locale of the Battle of Santiago de Cuba.
