= Schley, Minnesota =

Unincorporated community in Minnesota, US

Schley
- Unincorporated community
- Location within Minnesota Location within the United States
- Coordinates: 47°22′08″N 94°24′58″W
- Country: United States
- State: Minnesota
- County: Cass
- Elevation: 1,312 ft (400 m)
- Time zone: UTC-6 (Central (CST))
  - Summer (DST): UTC-5 (CDT)
- ZIP code: 56633
- Area code: 218
- GNIS feature ID: 658177

Schley is an unincorporated community in Cass County, Minnesota, United States, within the Bowstring State Forest and the Chippewa National Forest. It is located between Cass Lake and Bena along U.S. Highway 2 near Forest Road 2958.

== History ==
Schley was established as a station on the Great Northern Railway in the summer of 1898, shortly after US Naval Commodore Winfield Scott Schley's Flying Squadron defeated the Spanish Navy in the Battle of Santiago de Cuba. Schley and the two railroad stations immediately to the west - Santiago and Cuba - commemorate this victory.

A post office was established at Schley in 1931, and remained in operation until it was discontinued in 1968.
