= Francis A. Cook =

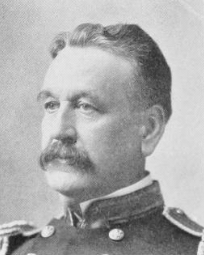
- Born: May 10, 1843; Northampton, Massachusetts, US
- Died: October 8, 1916 (aged 73); Northampton, Massachusetts, US
- Resting place: U.S. Naval Academy Cemetery
- Occupation: Naval officer

Francis Augustus Cook (1843–1916) was a career United States Navy officer who served from 1860 until 1903. He is most famous for being the commanding officer of the USS Brooklyn at the Battle of Santiago de Cuba. He was one of the few United States Navy officers to serve in combat in both the American Civil War and the Spanish–American War.

== Early life ==
He was born in Northampton, Massachusetts, on May 10, 1843. He was the son of Benjamin E. Cook and Elizabeth Christine (Griffin) Cook. His father was a general in the Massachusetts Militia.

== Naval career ==
He was appointed as a midshipman at the United States Naval Academy in 1860. He graduated and was promoted to acting Ensign on October 1, 1863. He served on board the USS Seminole at the Battle of Mobile Bay on August 5, 1864.

He rose to the rank of captain in February 1896 and became the commanding officer of the cruiser USS Brooklyn in December 1896. The Brooklyn was assigned as the flagship of the Flying Squadron under Rear Admiral Winfield Scott Schley with Cook serving as Schley's flag captain and de facto chief of staff.

The Brooklyn, under Cook's command, highly distinguished herself at the Battle of Santiago de Cuba on July 3, 1898. Captain Cook received the surrender of the Spanish ship Cristobal Colon after the battle.

He was promoted to rear admiral on March 21, 1903, and retired on September 5 of the same year.

He was a member of the Military Order of the Loyal Legion of the United States and the Military Order of Foreign Wars.

He died in Northampton, Massachusetts, on October 8, 1916, at the age of 73. He is buried in the United States Naval Academy Cemetery in Annapolis, Maryland.

== Sources ==
- Dictionary of Admirals of the U.S. Navy. William B. Cogar. Naval Institute Press. Annapolis, Maryland. 1991. Volume 2 (1901–1918). pg. 54.
