= USS Brooklyn (ACR-3) =

United States Navy armored cruiser

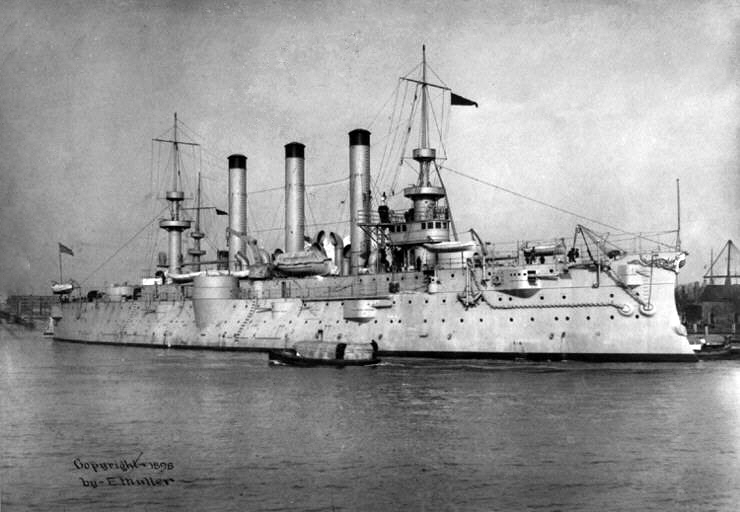
- USS Brooklyn (ACR-3), at anchor, c. 1898.

Class overview
- Builders: William Cramp & Sons, PA (1)
- Operators: United States Navy
- Preceded by: USS New York (ACR-2)
- Succeeded by: Pennsylvania class
- Built: 1893–1896
- In commission: 1896–1921
- Completed: 1
- Scrapped: 1

History

United States
- Name: Brooklyn
- Namesake: City of Brooklyn, New York
- Ordered: 19 July 1892
- Awarded: 11 February 1893
- Builder: William Cramp & Sons, Philadelphia
- Cost: $3,450,420.29 (hull and machinery)
- Yard number: 275
- Laid down: 2 August 1893
- Launched: 2 October 1895
- Sponsored by: Miss Ida May Schieren
- Commissioned: 1 December 1896
- Decommissioned: 9 March 1921
- Reclassified: CA-3, 17 July 1920
- Stricken: 9 March 1921
- Identification: Hull symbol:ACR-3; Hull symbol:CA-3
- Fate: Sold for scrap 20 December 1921

General characteristics (as built)
- Type: Armored cruiser
- Displacement: 9,215 long tons (9,363 t) (standard); 10,068 long tons (10,230 t) (full load)
- Length: 402 ft 7 in (122.71 m)oa; 400 ft 6 in (122.07 m)pp
- Beam: 64 ft 8 in (19.71 m)
- Draft: 24 ft (7.3 m) (mean)
- Installed power: 5 × double-ended boilers, 2 × single-ended boilers; 4 × vertical triple expansion reciprocating engines; 16,000 ihp (12,000 kW) (design)
- Propulsion: 2 × screws
- Speed: 20 knots (37 km/h; 23 mph) (design); 21.91 knots (40.58 km/h; 25.21 mph) (Speed on Trial)
- Complement: 561 officers and enlisted
- Armament: 8 × 8 in (203 mm)/35 caliber Mark 3 and/or Mark 4 breech-loading rifles (4 × 2); 12 × 5 in (127 mm)/40 caliber rapid fire (RF) guns; 12 × 6-pounder (57 mm (2.2 in)) Driggs-Schroeder RF guns; 4 × 1-pounder (37 mm (1.5 in)) Driggs-Schroeder saluting guns; 5 × 18-inch (450 mm) torpedo tubes
- Armor: Belt: 3 in (76 mm); Deck: 6 in (152 mm) sloped sides, 3 in (76 mm) flat middle (amidships); 2 1/2 in (64 mm) (forward & aft); Turrets: 5 1/2 in (140 mm); 3 in (76 mm) (hoists); Barbettes: 8–4 in (203–102 mm); Secondary sponsons: 4 in (102 mm); Conning Tower: 8 1/2 in (216 mm)

General characteristics (1914)
- Armament: 8 × 8 in (203 mm)/35 caliber Mark 3 and/or Mark 4 breech-loading rifles (4 x 2); 12 × 5 in (127 mm)/40 caliber RF breech-loading rifles; 4 × 6-pounder (57 mm (2.2 in)) Driggs-Schroeder saluting guns

General characteristics (1917)
- Armament: 8 × 8 in (203 mm)/35 caliber Mark 3 and/or Mark 4 breech-loading rifles (4 x 2); 8 × 5 in (127 mm)/40 caliber RF breech-loading rifles; 2 × 3 in (76 mm)/50 caliber anti-aircraft guns; 4 × 6-pounder (57 mm (2.2 in)) Driggs-Schroeder saluting guns

USS Brooklyn (ACR-3/CA-3) was the third United States Navy armored cruiser, the only one to be named at commissioning for a city rather than a state.

Ordered for $3,450,420.29 (hull and machinery), she was launched on 2 October 1895 by William Cramp & Sons Ship and Engine Building Company of Philadelphia; sponsored by Miss Ida May Schieren, daughter of Charles A. Schieren, Mayor of Brooklyn, New York; and commissioned on 1 December 1896, Captain Francis Augustus Cook in command.

== Design and construction ==
Brooklyn was said to be an improved New York at the time of her completion. She was also designed by the Navy Department and was about 1,000 tons larger, which allowed for a raised forecastle for better seakeeping. However, Brooklyn sacrificed armor for improved armament. She had eight 8-inch guns compared to New York's six, and all were in twin turrets. The secondary armament was increased in caliber from New York's 4-inch guns to 5-inch guns. Brooklyn had her turrets in a "lozenge" arrangement (one each fore and aft, one on each side) and also had a tumblehome hull, which allowed the side turrets to fire dead ahead and astern. She was the only US Navy ship built with this turret arrangement. The armored cruiser New York had a similar arrangement, however, her midships guns were casemate-mounted rather than in turrets. The tumblehome hull and "lozenge" arrangement were rare in the US Navy, but at the time were prevalent in the French Navy and in French-designed Russian ships, such as the French Magenta and the Russian Tsesarevich.

Compared with New York, Brooklyn had a 3 in (76 mm) belt versus 4 in (102 mm), 8 in (203 mm) barbettes versus 10 in (254 mm), and the same turret and deck armor.

=== Armament ===
Brooklyn as built had a main armament of eight 8 in (203 mm)/35 caliber Mark 3 and/or Mark 4 breech-loading rifles in four twin Mark 8 turrets in a "lozenge" arrangement. The forward and starboard side turrets were electric-powered, while the other two turrets were steam-powered. This was to test which system was better, and as a result the Navy adopted electric power for future turret designs. Secondary armament was twelve 5 in (127 mm)/40 caliber rapid fire (RF) guns in sponsons along the sides, along with twelve 6-pounder (57 mm (2.2 in)) Driggs-Schroeder RF guns, four 1-pounder (37 mm (1.5 in)) Driggs-Schroeder saluting guns, and five 18-inch (450 mm) torpedo tubes. Some additional weapons on wheeled carriages were carried for use by landing parties; these included two 3-inch (76 mm) field artillery pieces and four Gatling guns.

=== Armor ===
Brooklyn had significantly less protection than New York, to allow for increased armament. The belt was 3 in (76 mm) thick and 8 feet 6 inches (2.59 m) deep, of which 5 ft (1.5 m) was below the waterline. It protected only the machinery spaces. The armored deck was 6 in (152 mm) thick on its sloped sides and 3 in (76 mm) in the flat middle amidships, but only 2 1/2 in (64 mm) at the ends. The gun turrets had up to 5 1/2 in (140 mm) of armor, on 8–4 in (203–102 mm) barbettes with 3 in (76 mm) protecting the ammunition hoists. The secondary gun sponsons had 4 in (102 mm), while the conning tower was 8 1/2 in (216 mm) thick.

=== Engineering ===
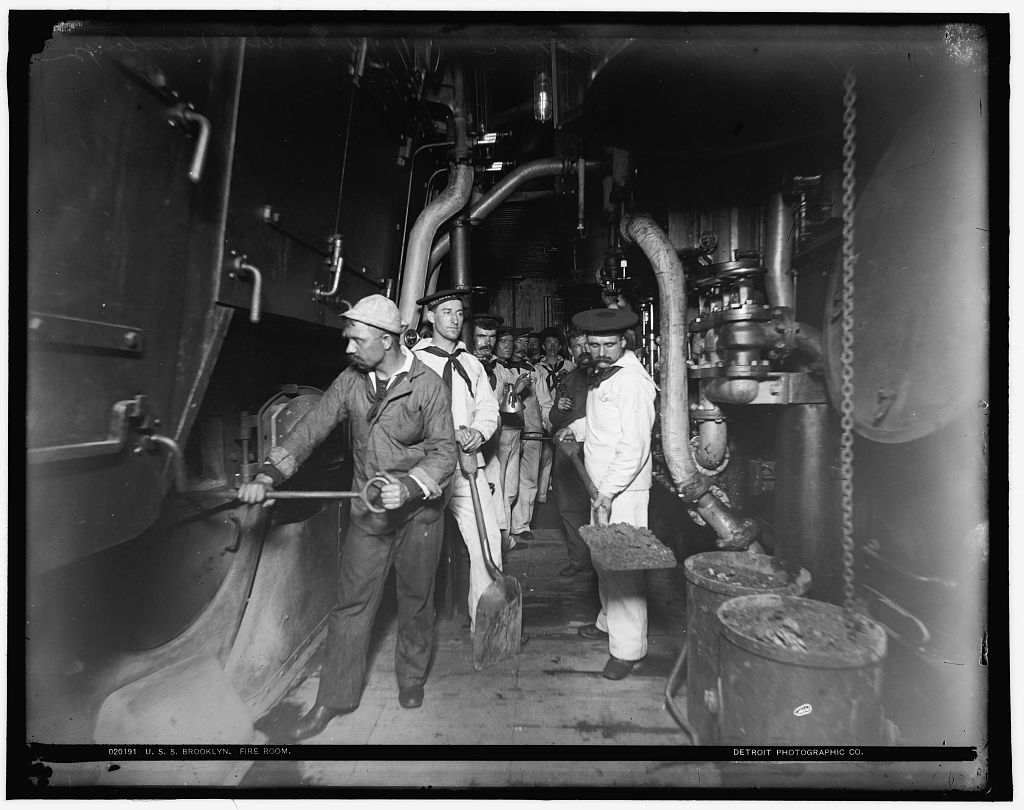
U.S.S. Brooklyn fire room

Brooklyn was intended to be relatively fast at 20 knots (37 km/h; 23 mph), and achieved 21.91 knots (40.58 km/h; 25.21 mph) on trials. Her machinery was generally similar to New York, but achieved 1,300 ihp (970 kW) additional horsepower and an extra knot on trials. Four triple-expansion engines totaling 16,000 ihp (12,000 kW) (designed, 18,769 ihp (13,996 kW) on trials) were clutched in tandem, two on each of two shafts. The forward engines could be disconnected to conserve fuel at an economical cruising speed. In the US Navy, only New York shared this feature, which proved something of a liability in the Battle of Santiago de Cuba, when both ships were operating with the forward engines disconnected and did not have time to reconnect them, thus limiting their speed. Seven coal-fired cylindrical boilers, five double-ended and two single-ended, supplied steam to the engines.

=== Refits ===
Brooklyn's refits were relatively modest. Her torpedo tubes were removed prior to 1914; one source says by 1903. By 1917 the 5-inch guns had been reduced to eight while two 3 in (76 mm)/50 caliber anti-aircraft guns were added.

== Service history ==
Brooklyn's first assignment was a special cruise to Britain with representatives of the U.S. for the Diamond Jubilee of Queen Victoria. The cruiser returned to the east coast in July 1897 and cruised there and in the West Indies until becoming flagship of the Flying Squadron under Commodore W. S. Schley on 28 March 1898.

=== Spanish–American War ===
During the Spanish–American War, the Flying Squadron arrived at Cienfuegos, Cuba on 21 May and established the blockade of that port. On 26 May, the Squadron arrived at Santiago de Cuba, where the Spanish fleet was being held behind the protection of the forts. Brooklyn was a key vessel in the Battle of Santiago de Cuba on 3 July, in which the Spanish Fleet was destroyed. Although she was struck 20 times by whole shot, Brooklyn suffered only one man wounded (Fireman J. Bevins) and one man killed (Chief Yeoman George Henry Ellis).

Brooklyn returned to Tompkinsville, New York on 20 August; cruised along the Atlantic coast and in Caribbean waters; participated in the Spanish–American War Victory Celebration at New York on 5 October; and in the Dewey Celebration at New York in September 1899. She left Hampton Roads on 16 October and sailed via the Suez Canal to Manila, Philippine Islands, where she arrived on 16 December. She became flagship of the Asiatic Squadron and participated in the China Relief Expedition (8 July – 11 October 1900. She made a cruise to the Dutch East Indies, Australia and New Zealand from 10 April – 7 August 1901; the last stage was to Melbourne, Auckland, Wellington and Sydney. She remained with the Asiatic Squadron until 1 March 1902, when she sailed for the United States via the Suez Canal and arrived at the New York Navy Yard on 1 May.

=== Post-war ===
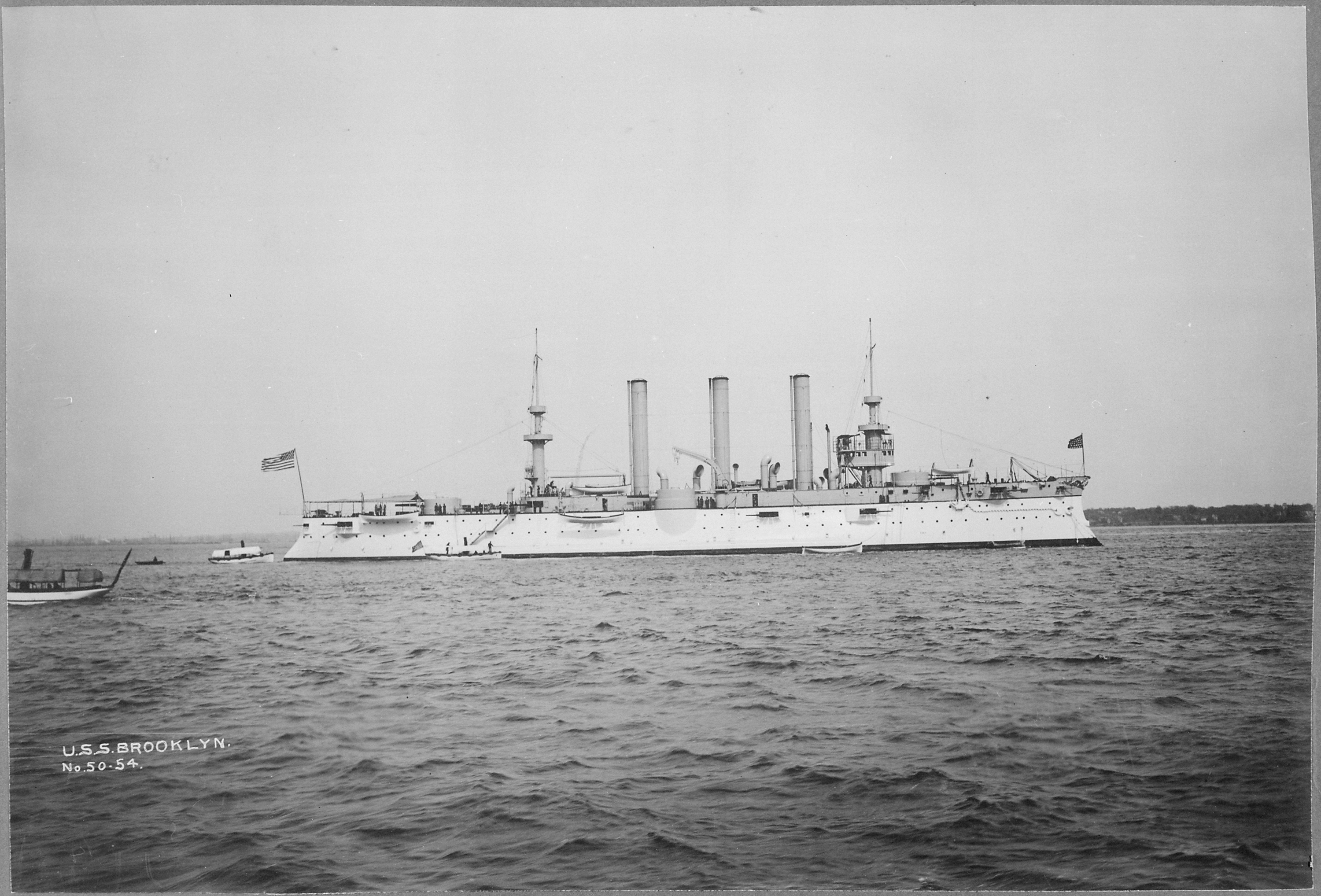
Brooklyn in 1899

On 20 May 1902, Brooklyn was at Havana, Cuba, for the ceremonies to transfer the authority on that island from the United States Government to the Cuban Government. In June–July, she was on special duty in connection with the funeral of the late British Ambassador to the United States Lord Pauncefote. During the next four years, she cruised with the North Atlantic Fleet and the European Squadron. She was involved in the intervention in Syria from 8 September to 17 October 1903 as well as the intervention in Djibouti from 21 November 1903 to 18 January 1904.

Brooklyn returned to New York on 26 May 1905. On 7 June, as flagship of Rear Admiral Charles Dwight Sigsbee, she sailed for Cherbourg, France, where the remains of the late John Paul Jones were received aboard and brought to America. Upon arrival at Annapolis, Commodore Jones' remains were transferred ashore to a receiving vault at the United States Naval Academy with appropriate ceremonies on 23 July.

Following a naval militia cruise (from 3–23 August 1905) and a tour in the Mediterranean (from 28 December 1905 – 8 May 1906), Brooklyn went into reserve at the League Island Navy Yard in Philadelphia on 16 May 1906. Except for a short period (from 30 June – 2 August 1906) in commission for special service at Havana, Cuba, she remained in reserve until the spring of 1907. From 12 April – 4 December 1907, Brooklyn served as part of the permanent display at the Jamestown Exposition in Jamestown, Virginia. Following her return to Philadelphia, Brooklyn went into reserve again on 21 December.

Placed out of commission on 23 June 1908, she was commissioned in ordinary on 2 March 1914. She was assigned to the Atlantic Reserve Fleet and served as receiving ship at Boston Navy Yard from 24 July 1914 – 13 March 1915. She was placed in full commission at Philadelphia on 9 May 1915 and served on Neutrality Patrol around Boston Harbor until November, when she sailed to the Asiatic Station to serve as flagship for the Commander-in-Chief of the Asiatic Fleet. She attended to regular military and diplomatic duties in China, Japan, and Russia until September 1919, when she became the flagship of Commander, Division 1, Asiatic Fleet. In January 1920, she was assigned to the Pacific Fleet as flagship of Commander, Destroyer Squadrons, and remained there until 15 January 1921. She was redesignated as CA-3 (heavy cruiser) on 17 July 1920 as part of a fleetwide redesignation plan. Brooklyn was placed out of commission for the final time at Mare Island Navy Yard on 9 March 1921 and sold for disposal on 20 December.

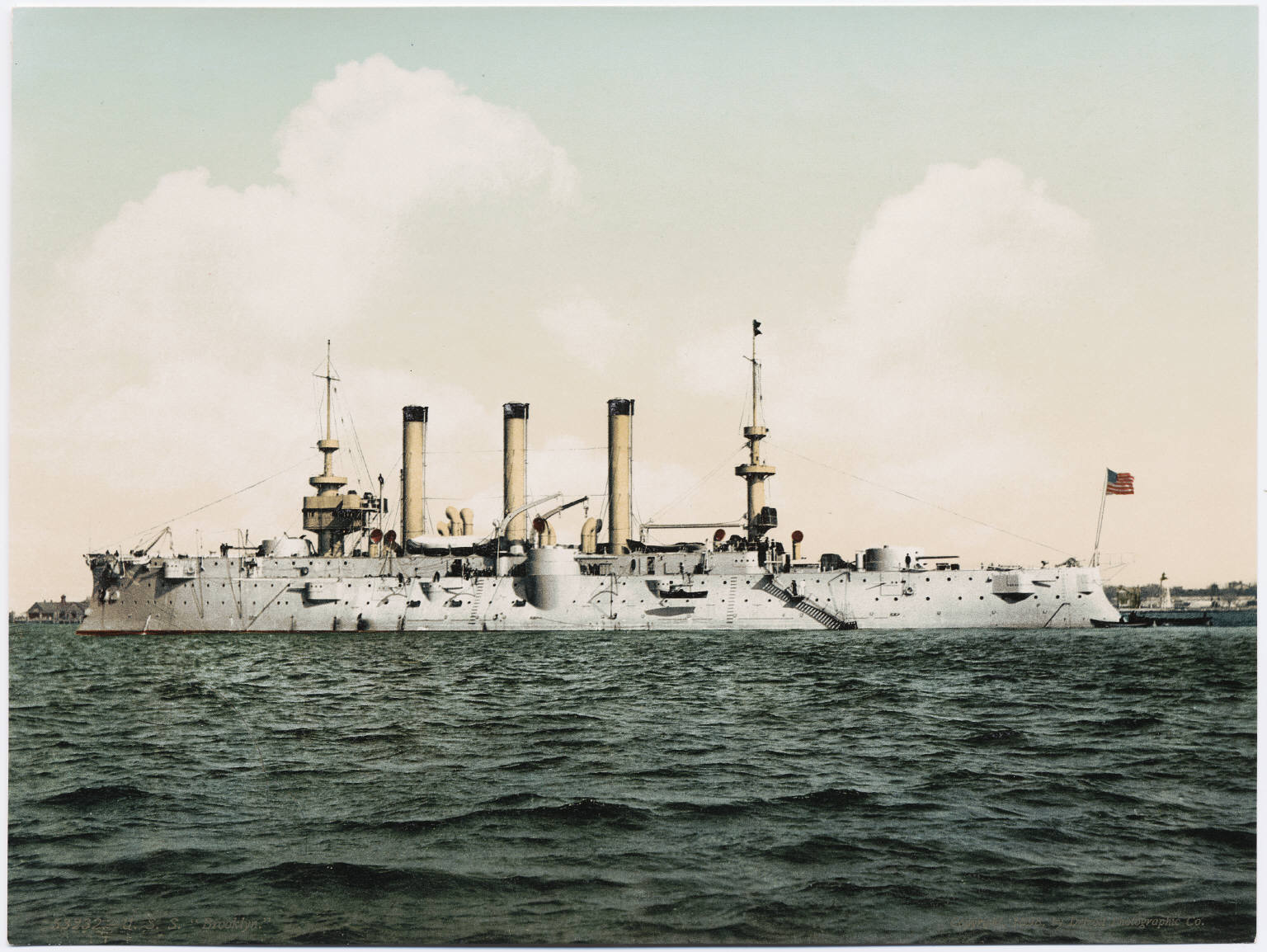
Colorized photo of Brooklyn

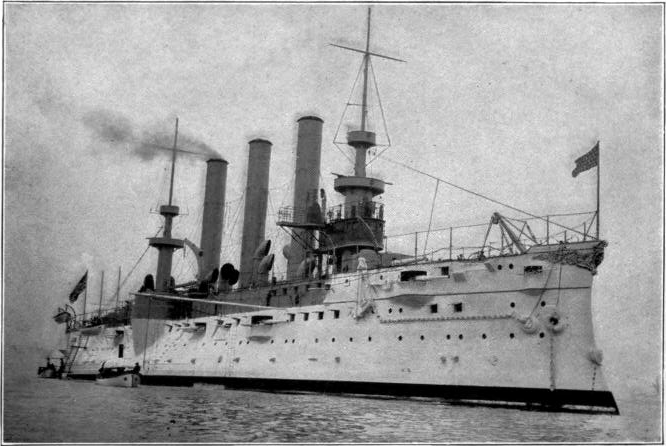
USS Brooklyn

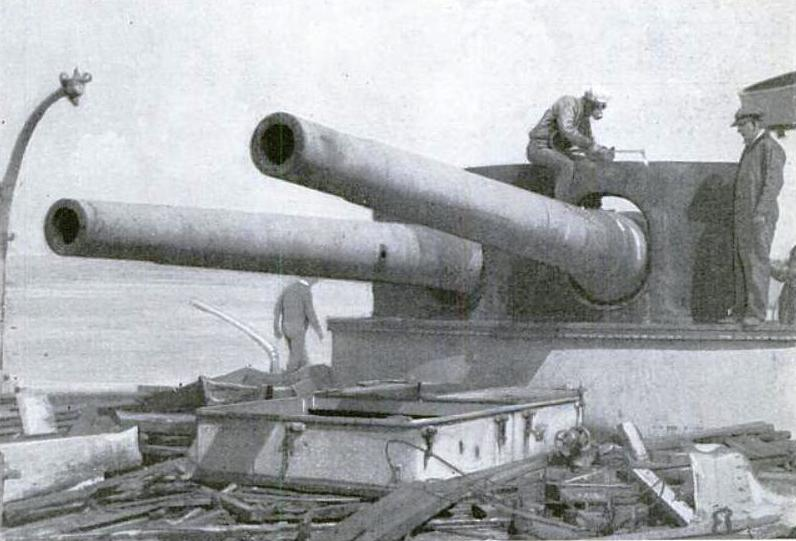
Workers cutting up a main turret of Brooklyn during the scrapping process c. 1922

== Awards ==
- Navy Expeditionary Medal (2 awards)
- Sampson Medal
- Spanish Campaign Medal
- Philippine Campaign Medal
- China Relief Expedition Medal
- Victory Medal with "ASIATIC" clasp

== Bibliography ==
- Alden, John D. American Steel Navy: A Photographic History of the U.S. Navy from the Introduction of the Steel Hull in 1883 to the Cruise of the Great White Fleet (1989) Annapolis, Maryland: Naval Institute Press, ISBN 0-87021-248-6
- Bauer, K. Jack; Roberts, Stephen S. (1991). Register of Ships of the U.S. Navy, 1775–1990: Major Combatants. Westport, Connecticut: Greenwood Press. ISBN 0-313-26202-0.
- Burr, Lawrence. US Cruisers 1883–1904: The Birth of the Steel Navy. Oxford : Osprey, 2008. ISBN 1-84603-267-9 OCLC 488657946
- Friedman, Norman (1984). U.S. Cruisers: An Illustrated Design History. Annapolis, Maryland: Naval Institute Press. ISBN 0-87021-718-6.
- Gardiner, Robert; Chesneau, Roger (1979). Conway's All the World's Fighting Ships 1860–1905. New York: Mayflower Books. ISBN 0-8317-0302-4.
- Gibbons, Tony (1983). The Complete Encyclopedia of Battleships. New York: Crescent Books. ISBN 0-517-378108.
- Head, Michael (2019). "Siberia". Warship International. LVI (1): 55–74. ISSN 0043-0374.
- Munsey's Magazine Volume XXVI. October 1901, to March 1902. Page 880. Article paragraph covered the Driggs-Schroeder six pounders carried on the USS Olympia, USS Brooklyn, and USS New York.
- Musicant, Ivan U.S. Armored Cruisers: A Design and Operational History (1985) Annapolis, Maryland: Naval Institute Press ISBN 0-87021-714-3
- Jane's Fighting Ships of World War I. London: Random House Group, Ltd. 2001. ISBN 1-85170-378-0.
