= Winfield Scott Schley =

United States Navy rear admiral (1839–1911)

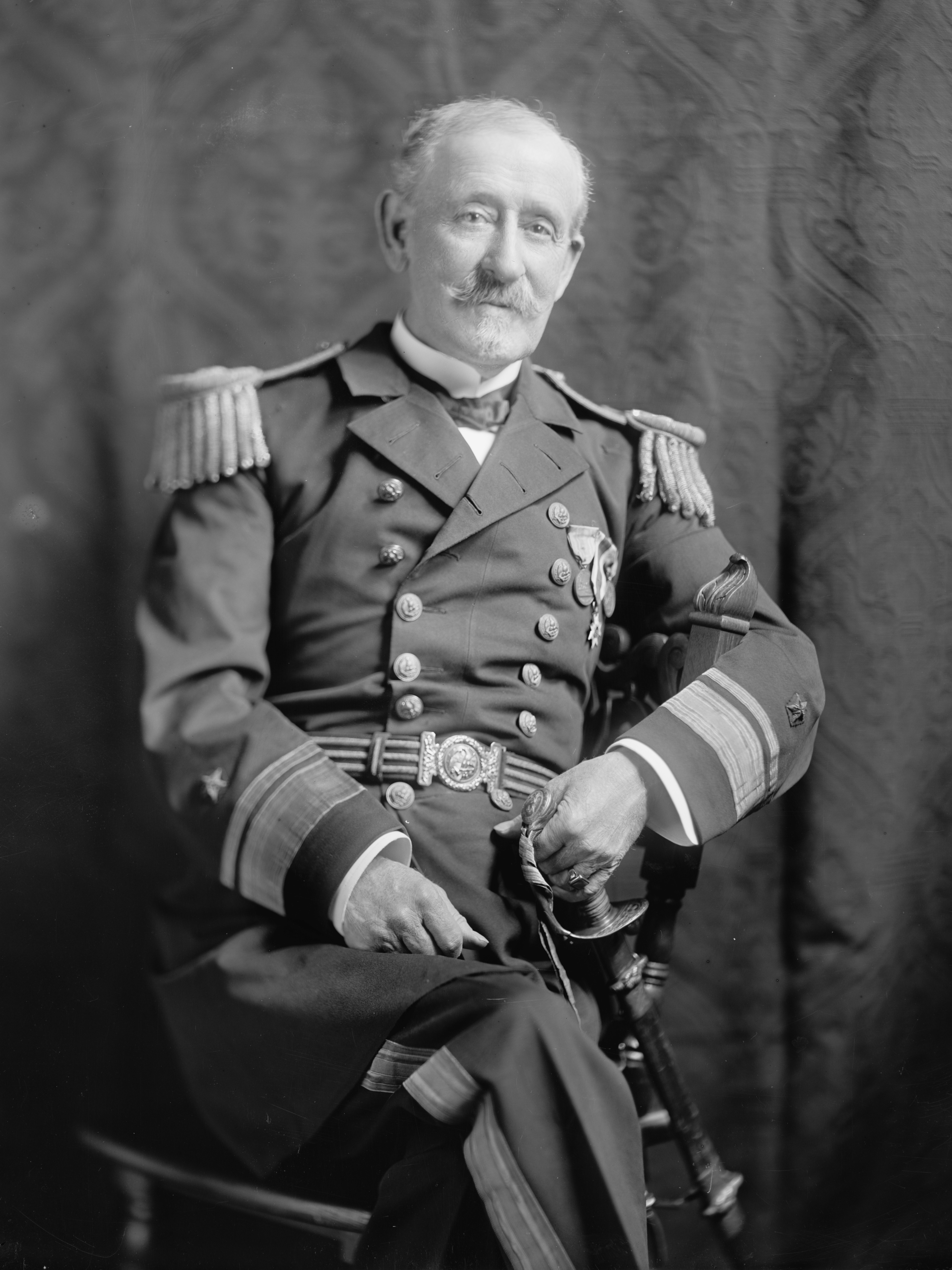
- Portrait of Schley
- Born: October 9, 1839; Near Frederick, Maryland, U.S.
- Died: October 2, 1911 (aged 71); New York City, U.S.
- Burial place: Arlington National Cemetery
- Military career
- Allegiance: United States
- Branch: United States Navy
- Service years: 1860–1901
- Rank: Rear Admiral
- Units: Brooklyn
- Commands: Flying Squadron
- Conflicts: American Civil War; Spanish–American War

Signature
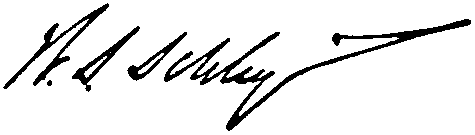

Winfield Scott Schley (9 October 1839 – 2 October 1911) was an American rear admiral in the United States Navy and the hero of the Battle of Santiago de Cuba during the Spanish–American War.

== Biography ==
=== Early life ===
Born at "Richfields" (his father's farm), near Frederick, Maryland, Schley graduated from the United States Naval Academy in 1860, and went as midshipman on board the frigate Niagara to China and Japan.

=== Civil War ===
On his return in 1861, the American Civil War was in progress. He was made master, and was assigned to the frigate Potomac of the Western Gulf Squadron until 1862. He then served on the sidewheel gunboat Winona of that squadron, and later on the sloops Monongahela and Richmond, and participated in all the engagements that led to the capture of Port Hudson, Louisiana, on the Mississippi River in 1863, (part of the campaign to split the Confederacy at Vicksburg), having been promoted to lieutenant on 16 July 1862.

=== Chincha Island War and San Salvador Revolution ===
He was ordered from the waters of the South in 1864 to the Pacific Squadron, where he served on the sidewheel gunboat Wateree as executive officer until 1866. He suppressed an insurrection of Chinese workers on the Chincha Islands in 1865, and later in the same year landed at La Unión, El Salvador, to protect American interests during a revolution. He was promoted lieutenant commander in 1866.

=== Korean Expedition ===
From 1866 to 1869, he was an instructor in the United States Naval Academy. He was then assigned to the Asiatic Station, and served there on the screw sloop Benicia until 1872 and was adjutant of the land forces during the attack by Rear Admiral John Rodgers's expedition on the Korean forts on Ganghwa Island on 10 June and 11 June 1871. He then participated in the following Battle of Gangwha which caused the destruction of the Korean fortifications.

=== Between conflicts, 1870s–1890s ===
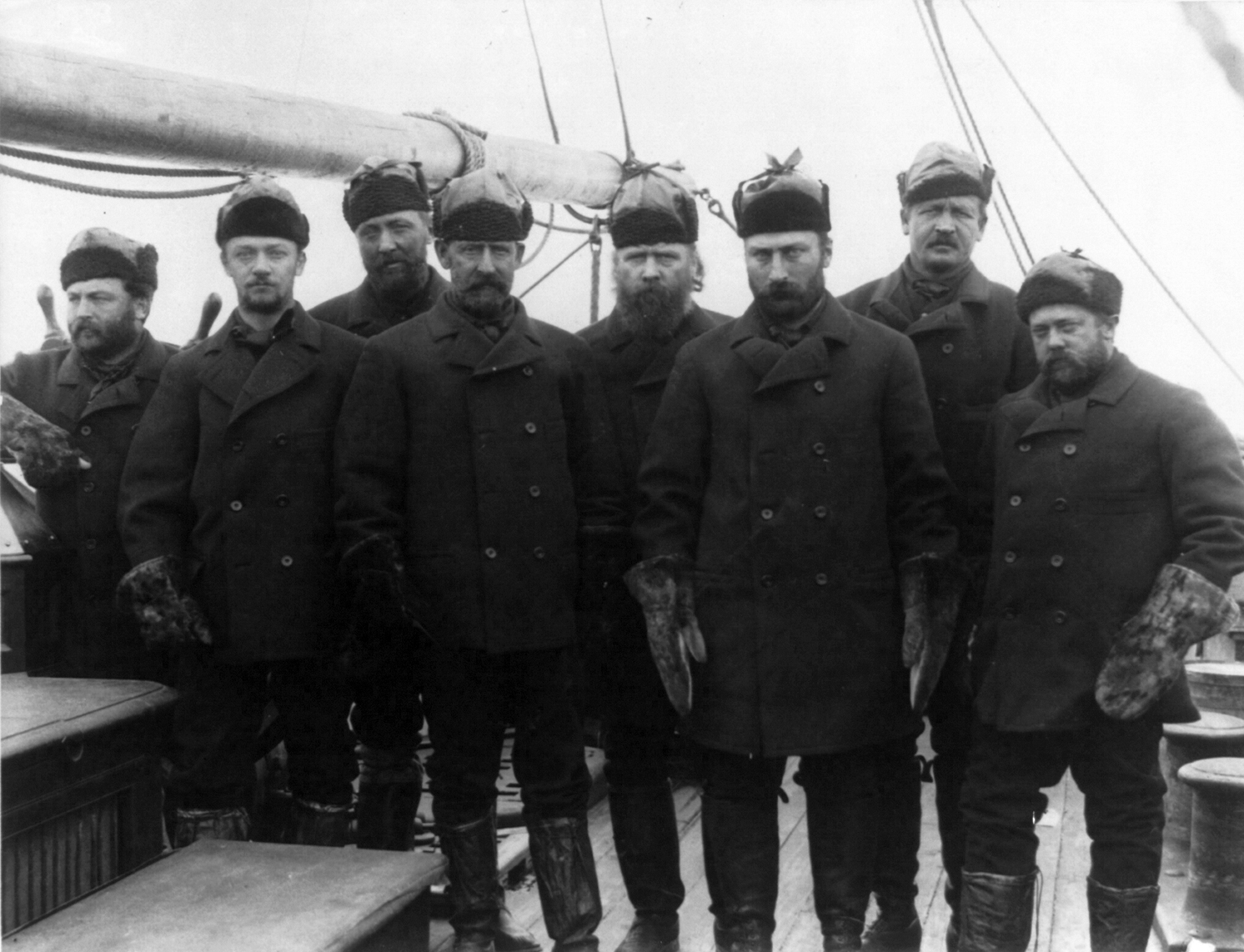
Schley (fourth from left) and the crew that rescued the survivors of Adolphus Greely's expedition

From 1872 to 1875, he was head of the department of modern languages in the Naval Academy. He was promoted commander in June 1874.

After serving in Europe and on the west coast of Africa, he commanded the sloop of war Essex from 1876 to 1879, most of the time in the South Atlantic on the Brazil Station. During the cruise he sailed Essex to the vicinity of the South Shetland Islands in search of a missing sealer, and rescued a shipwrecked crew on the islands of Tristan da Cunha. From 1879 until October 1883, he was inspector of the Second Lighthouse District.

After re-supply and relief missions repeatedly failed to reach Lieutenant Adolphus Greely's Lady Franklin Bay Expedition in the Arctic, Schley was appointed in February 1884 to command the next relief expedition. His flagship was the recently purchased Canadian sailing bark Bear, which would go on to have a long and distinguished career in Federal service. On 22 June, near Cape Sabine in Grinnell Land, Schley rescued Greely and six (of his twenty-four) companions, after passing through 1,400 miles (2,300 km) of ice during the voyage.

Schley was commissioned chief of the bureau of equipment and recruiting at the United States Department of the Navy in 1885, and promoted captain in March 1888.

He commanded one of the earliest protected cruisers, Baltimore, in Rear Admiral George Brown's squadron off the coast of Chile in 1891, going to the port of Valparaiso, when a number of American sailors there were stoned by a mob. In August 1891, Baltimore, still under his command, was detailed to convey the remains of John Ericsson, designer of the famed first Civil War ironclad ship Monitor to Sweden.

Early in 1892 he was again transferred to the Lighthouse Bureau, and until February 1895 was inspector of the Third Lighthouse District. In 1895, he was placed in command of the armored cruiser New York. From 1897 to 1898, he was a member (and chairman) of the Lighthouse Board.

=== Spanish–American War ===
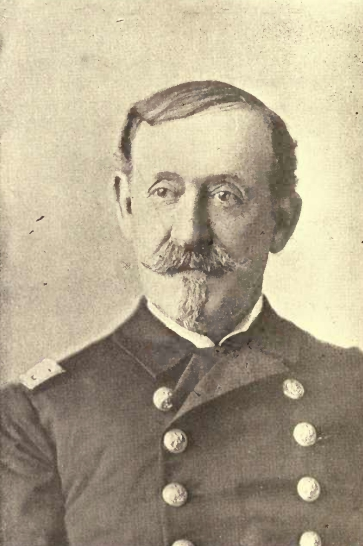
Rear Admiral Winfield Scott Schley during the Spanish–American War

Schley was commissioned commodore on 6 February 1898, and on 24 March, although lowest on the list of commodores, he was put in command of the Flying Squadron, with the armored cruiser Brooklyn as his flagship, for service in the Spanish–American War.

On 18 May 1898, "Schley's Flying Squadron" was sent by Acting Rear Admiral William T. Sampson to Cienfuegos to pursue the Spanish Squadron under the command of Admiral Pascual Cervera y Topete. When Sampson received news that Cervera was in Santiago de Cuba, not Cienfuegos, he initially vacillated, at first informing Schley of the rumor, yet requesting him to stay at Cienfuegos, then later changing his orders to have Schley investigate the situation at Santiago.

Although Schley was subordinate to Sampson, he was accustomed to exercising independent command of his ship. Schley decided to stay at Cienfuegos, feeling that all signs indicated that Cervera was there in the harbor. After hearing from Cuban insurgents that Cervera was definitely not at Cienfuegos, Schley decided to obey Sampson's orders three days after receiving them and go to Santiago. When the crew of three American cruisers he encountered denied knowledge of Cervera's whereabouts, Schley decided to return to Key West, Florida, to get coal for his ship. The Navy Department sent a dispatch to Schley asking him to stay at Santiago, but he replied that he was unable to obey these orders. Inexplicably, Schley decided mid-voyage to return to Santiago on 28 May, where the following day it was confirmed that the Spanish Squadron was there. Sampson arrived on 1 June and assumed command. The American ships formed a reverse crescent from west to south to east to blockade the narrow south facing harbor entrance channel to trap the Spanish ships. Generally, the crescent would be made up of the faster cruiser Brooklyn and battleship Texas to the west and south and the heavier battleships Oregon, Iowa, and Massachusetts to the south and east. The concept was that the bigger but slower warships would shield the Daiquiri beachhead and supply ships to supporting the land invasion to the east and the faster ships to the west would be able to converge on the Spanish fleet as it came out. Clearly the greatest concern to the Navy was protecting the Army beachhead from a Spanish sortie. Of less concern was the Spanish ships running to the west to escape. There was one other ship, the armored cruiser New York, as fast as Brooklyn but less heavily armed, which Sampson used as his own flagship.

=== Battle of Santiago ===
On 3 July, while Sampson in New York was en route to meet General William Shafter onshore in Cuba and Massachusetts was off coaling at Guantanamo, Admiral Cervera attempted to force his squadron through the blockade by coming out of the channel to Santiago harbor with guns blazing and then turning west. Schley had assumed control in Sampson's absence. Brooklyn, his flagship, was placed on the extreme western side of the American crescent. As part of his plan, Cervera intentionally steered Infanta Maria Teresa, his flagship and lead ship of the Spanish Squadron, and already significantly damaged as it passed by Iowa, which caught it with two 12-inch (300 mm) shells, directly at Brooklyn with the intent to ram and/or launch bow torpedoes (which had very short range). Cervera's intent was to sacrifice Infanta Maria Teresa to make a hole to the west for the rest of the Spanish ships, which had followed Infanta Maria Teresa out of the narrow channel in single file and through the gauntlet of Indiana and Iowa to the east and Texas and Oregon to the south, and take out Brooklyn, the fastest ship in the American fleet. Brooklyn and Texas rushed forward initially at the Spanish (this was the general plan, to close with the enemy as quickly as possible), but, as Infanta Maria Teresa turned west, Texas matched its direction to offer its broadside and run with the Spanish fleet, as did Oregon behind it. The firing was continuous from all ships, with the Americans somewhat blinded by the smoke, more so than the Spaniards.

Schley, in Brooklyn, moving east, suddenly realizing that Infanta Maria Teresa was not going to veer off but was going to ram or launch torpedoes, ordered Brooklyn to steer away from the surprisingly aggressive Infanta Maria Teresa back towards the path of the rest of the squadron. This action caused Texas, which was just getting up to full speed, to suddenly reverse its engines for three minutes, bringing it to a near stop. Texas stopped because it could no longer see Brooklyn after it had noted the start of the latter's turn in its general direction. This action by Texas was precautionary but clearly prudent, as a collision would have been a disaster. It is not documented how close Brooklyn crossed the bow of Texas. A newspaper artist later put it very close, and Captain John Woodward Philip, commander of Texas, stated later that Brooklyn was quite large in appearance as it crossed in front of Texas as the massive armored cruiser appeared out of the smoke. Subsequently, the now stationary Texas was also forced to cease firing, as Oregon, now moving at a surprising speed for a pre-dreadnought battleship, ran up aft of Texas and properly, due to its greater firepower, passed to the inside towards the Spanish fleet, effectively masking the fire of Texas for a few minutes. This was not particularly grave as Texas, an obsolescent design (one of the first heavily armored U.S. Navy battleships), could not put out near the rate of fire of the other newer battleships. When Oregon passed, Texas found itself engaged by Almirante Oquendo, the fourth ship in the Spanish line, and received four hits, the Spaniard firing the last of its "good" ammunition (the Spanish vessels were handicapped because their otherwise rapid-firing 5.5-inch (140 mm) guns only had a limited supply of properly made ammunition, which they expended very quickly). Ironically, because Texas had already to some extent engaged Infanta Maria Teresa, Vizcaya, and Cristóbal Colón, and now Almirante Oquendo more closely and even the trailing Spanish torpedo boats, Plutón and Furor and had been involved with the excitement of the maneuvers by Brooklyn and Oregon, it received excellent press, far more than it actually deserved, and this to some extent may have exacerbated the negative impression arising from it having to first stop to avoid potential collision and then having its fire masked. Texas had also already earned laurels during the taking of the Spaniards' Guantanamo, and would gain more in its engagement with Reina Mercedes after the battle, and this may have increased its perceived importance.

There is no doubt that Schley's turn gave the Spanish ships added time to get out of the mouth of Santiago harbor, but the American fleet, including Schley's Brooklyn, which had completed its turn and was still ahead of Oregon, closed and at only about 1,000 yards (910 m) engaged Vizcaya in a running fight. It was fortunate for Schley that Vizcaya, ordinarily a fast ship, was very slow due to having an extremely fouled hull and could not match the speed of Cristóbal Colón, which was now clear of the fight. Had the hull of Vizcaya been clean, Schley would have found himself chasing two ships and not fighting one. Infanta Maria Teresa was now on fire and was so damaged that it had to turn north and beach itself. The battle between Brooklyn and Vizcaya was ferocious for a time as the ships steamed west, but the quality weaponry of Brooklyn overwhelmed it, not to mention Oregon, which was astern and firing. Vizcaya, terribly damaged after a torpedo exploded internally and on fire, was forced to also beach itself. By this time Almirante Oquendo and the Spanish destroyers had also been overwhelmed by American fire.

Now Schley steamed after Cristóbal Colón with Oregon trailing and Texas following further behind, while Iowa and Indiana and auxiliary vessels saw to the aftermath of the rest of the disabled Spanish fleet. The race with Cristóbal Colón was dramatic, but Cristóbal Colón eventually slowed as its small supply of English coal ran out and it had to rely on lower-quality fuel; eventually it was forced to try to turn south and make a break. However, the long-range 13-inch (330 mm) guns of Oregon dissuaded it and, with Brooklyn immediately behind the captain of Cristóbal Colón, decided to beach and scuttle his ship. The capture of Cristóbal Colón was an exciting end to the battle. Captain Philip of Texas, who expressed no present or later ill will at the temporary discomfiture of Texas during the battle due to Brooklyn's turn, stated that when he was going to Brooklyn in a small boat to report to Schley, the commodore happily shouted down to him from the bridge, "Some fight, eh, Jack?"

All the while, Sampson in New York, too far to the east at his meeting, tried mightily to catch up to the battle. By the time New York reached the bulk of the Spanish fleet, the battle was over, and New York also could not catch the beaching of Cristóbal Colón. New York had not been able to fire a single shot, depriving Sampson of any participation in the battle.

When the victory message from Sampson, who was of course in overall command of the naval campaign, was reported, it contained no reference to any officer other than himself, even though he was not involved in the actual fighting. Sampson was loath to praise Schley's role in the battle, a fact which derived from professional jealousy, as was evidenced later by Sampson's own conduct at the subsequent court of inquiry. Sampson was of the opinion that had it not been for the Battle of Santiago de Cuba, Schley would have been court-martialed. The public, however, regarded Schley as the hero not only of the battle, but also of the war, while Sampson was seen (accurately) as indecorous for not acknowledging Schley's role.

=== Late career ===
On 14 April 1899, Schley was promoted to rear admiral. In November 1899, he was put in command of the South Atlantic Squadron, and, on 9 October 1901, he retired from active service upon reaching the age limit.

== Controversy relating to the Battle of Santiago ==
A controversy arose between partisans of Schley and those of Sampson over their respective claims to the credit of the victory over Cervera's fleet during the recent war. Of that discussion neither officer personally took public notice until after the appearance of a work by Edgar Stanton Maclay entitled History of the United States Navy. In that book, the author referred to Commodore Schley as a "caitiff, poltroon and coward." The proofs of the book had been read and approved by various naval officers, among them Rear Admiral Sampson.

At Schley's request, because of the charges made against him in the book, a court of inquiry was opened on September 12, 1901, composed of Admiral George Dewey, Rear Admiral Andrew E. K. Benham and Rear Admiral Francis Munroe Ramsay, which investigated Schley's conduct before and during the Battle of Santiago. On December 13, 1901, the court reported its proceedings and the testimony taken, with a full and detailed statement of all the pertinent facts which it deemed to be established, together with its opinion and recommendations. Various officers gave conflicting testimony as to Schley's conduct, with one, Captain Templin Potts, directly accusing Schley of cowardice.

The majority report of the court found that Commodore Schley failed to proceed to Santiago with due despatch, that the squadron should not have been delayed by the yacht USS Eagle, that he should not have turned westward, that he should have obeyed the Navy Department's order of May 25, 1898, that he did not do his utmost to capture Cristóbal Colón, that the turn of Brooklyn caused Texas to stop, for carelessness in endangering Texas, for blanketing the fire of other American vessels, that he did injustice to Lieutenant Commander Hodgson (Navigation officer of Brooklyn at the time of the incident), that his conduct in the Santiago campaign was characterized by vacillation, dilatoriness, and "lack of enterprise," and that his coal reports were inaccurate and misleading. Admiral George Dewey, however, presented a minority report, in which he praised Schley for promptness and efficient service, and gave him the credit for the destruction of Cervera's fleet.

The court recommended that no action be taken in view of the length of time which had elapsed. Rear Admiral Schley filed a protest against the court's findings, which, however, were approved by the Secretary of the Navy Long, who supported Sampson on grounds of rank and seniority. Nonetheless, the public press, and particularly the Hearst newspapers, saw the outcome as vindicating Schley, whose status as a war hero was enhanced by the exposure. In January 1902, Rear Admiral Schley appealed from the verdict to President Theodore Roosevelt, who, however, confirmed Secretary Long's approval.

== Other interests ==
Schley belonged to several military societies, including the Naval Order of the United States, the Military Order of Foreign Wars and the Military Order of the Loyal Legion of the United States (insignia number 9233). In 1905 he became a member of the Empire State Society of the Sons of the American Revolution and was assigned national membership number 17,070.

Schley wrote, with James Russell Soley, The Rescue of Greely (New York, 1885). He also wrote and published his autobiography, Forty-five Years under the Flag (New York, 1904).

== Death and burial ==
Rear Admiral Winfield Scott Schley died on October 2, 1911, nine years after Rear Admiral Sampson, who barely survived his retirement in 1902. At the time of his death, Schley was a noted resident of the famous Algonquin Hotel in Manhattan.

After his collapse and death along 5th Avenue near the hotel, Schley's body lay unrecognized and unclaimed in the back yard of the local police precinct for several hours. It was only after he was discovered missing that he was properly identified and retrieved by the indignant concierge of the Algonquin.

On October 5, 1911, Rear Admiral Schley was buried with full military honors at Arlington National Cemetery, in Virginia.

== Legacy ==
- In Baltimore, Maryland and Washington, D.C. there are streets named for him.
- There is a memorial to Schley in the lobby of the Maryland State House on State Circle in Annapolis.
- There is a bust of him by Ernest Keyser in Annapolis.
- USS Schley (DD-103/APD-14) was named in his honor.
- Schley, Minnesota, an unincorporated community in Cass County, is named after Commodore Schley.
- There is an Admiral Schley cocktail consisting of bourbon, dark rum, lime and sugar. The cocktail is mentioned both in The Gentleman's Companion and in the Old Waldorf Bar Book.
- A march dated 1901 and entitled All Honor to Admiral Schley was composed in his honor by W. D. Allen.OCLC 909811266

== Gallery ==
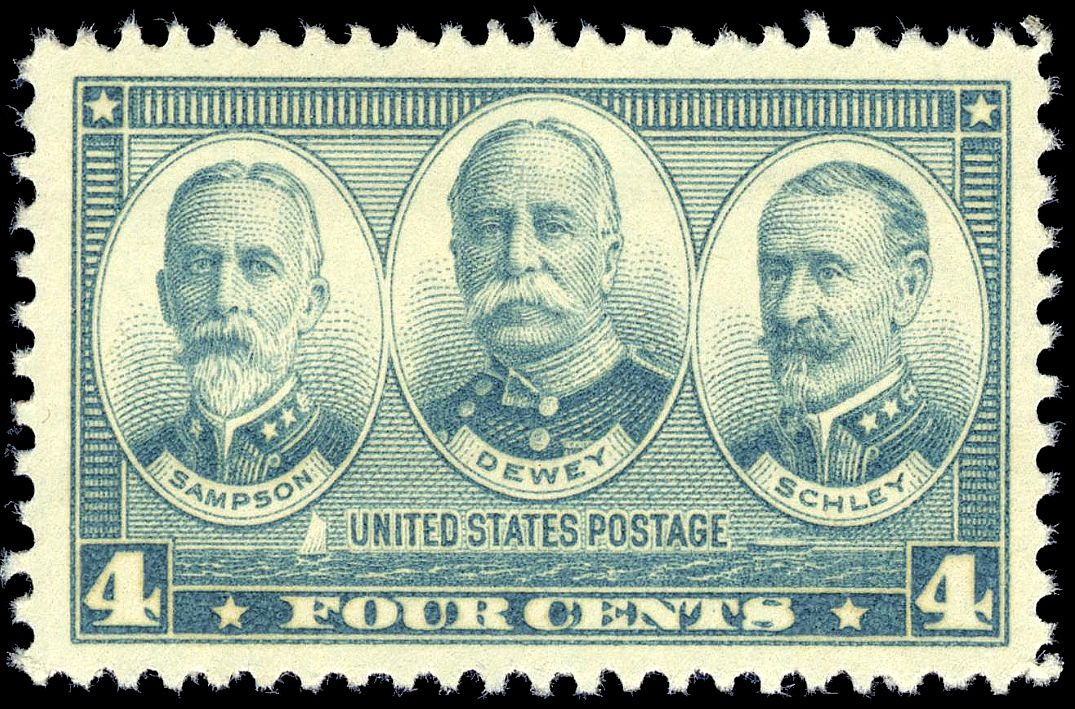
Sampson — Dewey — Schley issued March 23, 1937 See also: Army and Navy stamp issues of 1936-1937

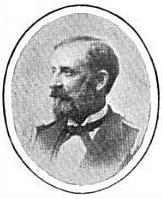
Photo of Schley

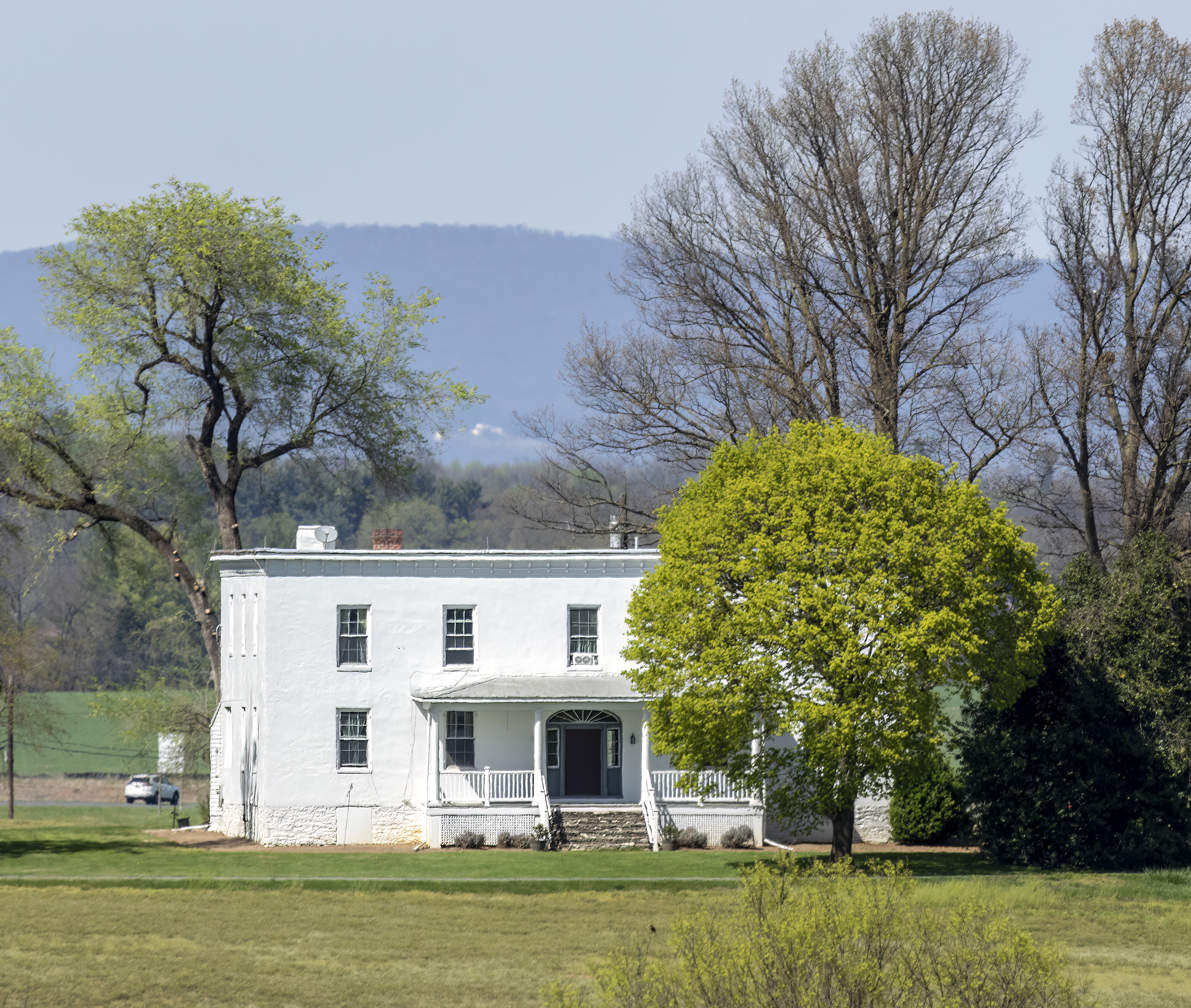
Schley's birthplace, Richfields
