= Battle of Santiago de Cuba =

Battle of the Spanish–American War

- Part of the Spanish–American War
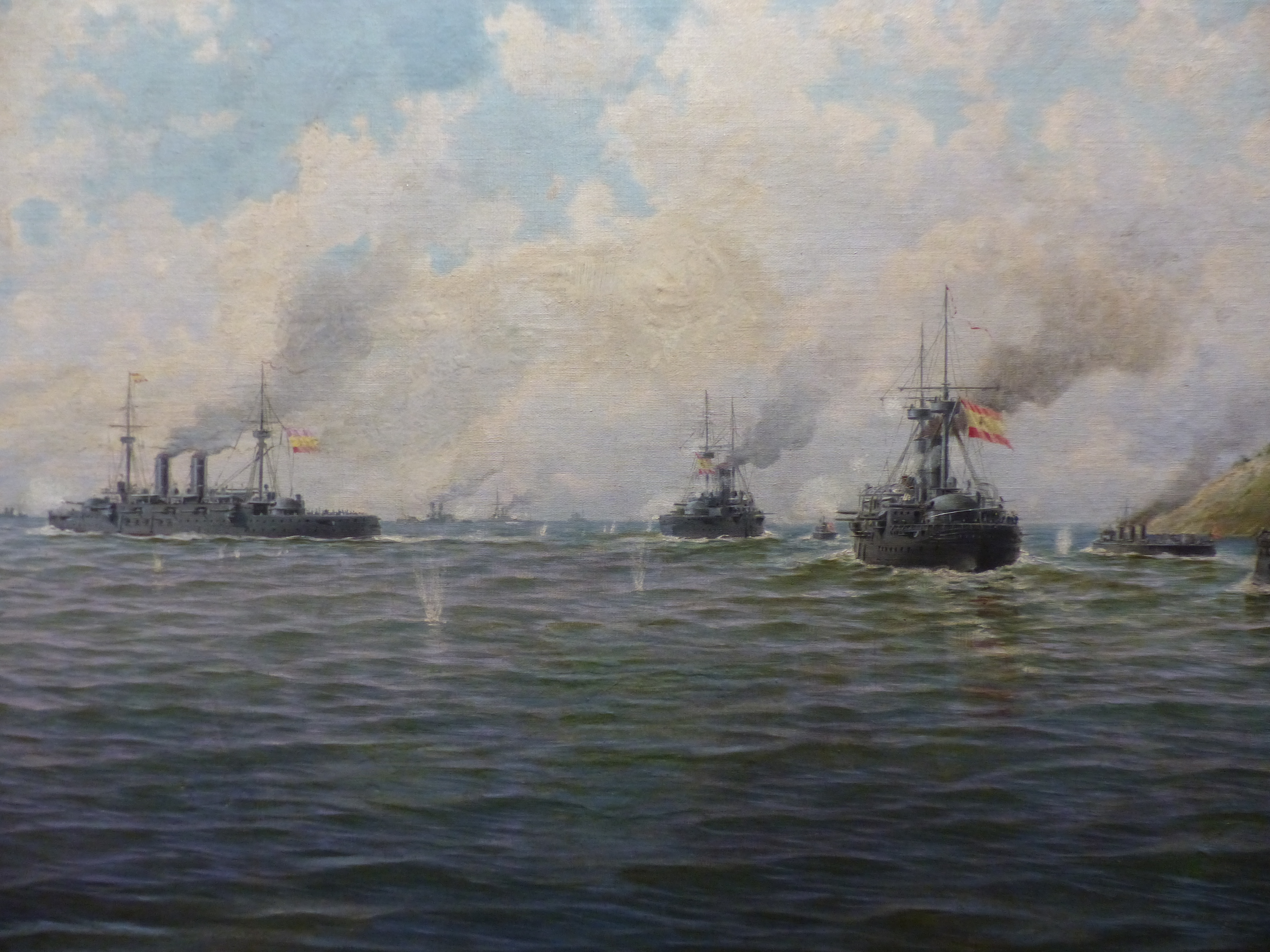
- Painting of the battle by Ildefonso Sanz Doménech
| Date | July 3, 1898 |
| Location | Off Santiago de Cuba, Caribbean Sea 19°57′36″N 75°52′30″W |
| Result | American victory |

Belligerents
| United States | Spain |

Commanders and leaders
| William T. Sampson; Winfield Scott Schley | Pascual Cervera (surrendered); Fernando Villaamil † |

Strength
| 5 battleships; 2 armored cruisers; 2 armed yachts | 4 armored cruisers; 2 destroyers |

Casualties and losses
| 1 killed; 1 wounded | 343 killed; 151 wounded; 1,889 captured; 4 armored cruisers sunk; 2 destroyers sunk |

The Battle of Santiago de Cuba was fought on July 3, 1898, between a United States Navy squadron led by Rear Admiral William T. Sampson and Commodore Winfield Scott Schley and a Spanish Navy squadron under Counter-admiral Pascual Cervera y Topete during the Spanish–American War. The significantly more powerful American squadron, comprising four battleships and two armored cruisers, decisively defeated the outgunned Spanish squadron, which consisted of four armored cruisers and two destroyers, sinking all of Cervera's ships while losing none of their own. The crushing defeat sealed the American victory in the Cuban theater of the war, ensuring Cuba's independence from Spanish rule.

Beginning in 1895, American-Spanish relations worsened over Spain's suppression of the Cuban War of Independence, with the American public being agitated by exaggerated reports of Spanish atrocities against Cubans. In January 1898, the American cruiser USS Maine was sent to Cuba to protect American interests in Cuba but less than a month later exploded in Havana harbor, killing 266 sailors and inflaming American opinion. Despite a lack of proof, Spain was portrayed as the culprit in the American yellow press and two months later the US declared war on Spain.

The Americans realized that defeating the Spanish squadron stationed in Cuba was vital to ensuring victory in the war. A squadron commanded by both Sampson and Schley was dispatched to ensure success, though both commanders had different approaches naval warfare. On July 3, Cervera's squadron steamed out of the harbor of Santiago de Cuba to engage the Americans. The Spanish, totally unprepared and outgunned, made a desperate attempt to reach the open sea with the American battleships and cruisers in hot pursuit. The entire Spanish squadron was sunk with minimal casualties for the Americans, who suffered only two men killed or wounded, while their opponents lost 343 killed and 151 wounded.

The Americans pulled a total of 1,889 Spanish servicemen from the water, among them Cervera. The captured Spaniards were treated with respect and care by the Americans, and Cervera became respected by the Americans for his dignified conduct during and after the battle. Although the battle ensured the American ground campaign to overthrow Spanish rule in Cuba would end in a success, tensions soon arose between Sampson and Schley, with various parties in the United States Navy and American public debating over which commander had made the greater contribution to victory, and the dispute reached the desk of Theodore Roosevelt. The battle remains one of the most significant naval battles in American maritime history.

== Background ==
=== Preliminary context ===
The battle marked the culmination of the Cuban Wars for Independence, which had been waged by Cuban revolutionaries against Spanish imperial power for several decades. The United States had political, economic, cultural, and ideological interests in Cuba. Within the larger context, many American political leaders, pushed by interventionist public opinion, were outraged by the publication of a private letter by Spanish Minister Enrique Dupuy de Lôme critical of US President William McKinley and by the destruction of the American armored cruiser USS Maine that was touted by newspapers at the time as the "Battleship Maine" for which a naval court of inquiry and American yellow journalism blamed Spain.

Cuban revolutionaries had staged revolts against Spanish colonial authority in the Ten Years' War (1868–1878), the Little War (1879–1880), and the Cuban War of Independence (1895–1898). During the last war, Spanish General Valeriano Weyler established a policy of interning Cubans in camps he called reconcentrados, which functioned as internment camps. The etymology behind the re- prefix is that formerly the Cubans lived in villages but now they were going to be redistributed into new villages under the hypocritical pretext that it was for their own protection. Spanish forces gathered Cubans who lived in the countryside and centralized them in camps, where they could be monitored. As a consequence, many Cubans died of disease and malnutrition. That policy did as much to paint the Spanish as barbarians to the Cuban natives and the United States as any other item of misrule by the Spanish.

With outrage over Weyler's seemingly-brutal policy and sympathy with the Cubans' struggle building, US public opinion pushed for war with Spain after the publication of the de Lôme Letter in February. Enrique Dupuy de Lôme had been appointed the Spanish Minister to the United States in 1892. In that capacity, it was his duty to refrain from allowing his personal beliefs to intervene with his public duty to support peaceful diplomatic relations between the United States and Spain. However, a letter that expressed his opposition to McKinley's foreign policy decisions was exposed, and the New York Journal translated and printed the letter. Many Americans considered it an insult to the nation and to the president.

Although Spain apologized on February 13, 1898, Maine exploded and sank in Havana Harbor, Cuba, two days later and killed 266 American sailors. After a hasty naval court of inquiry, the American press blamed Spain and accused it of planting a mine that sank the cruiser. The war with Spain became known as the "Correspondents' War". Journalists not only wrote stories about the conflict but also took part in the fight. In 1898, the prestige of the press ran high.

American society was changing as literacy rates increased. There was a new revolution of readers. As war zones became more open to the press, journalists wrote eyewitness accounts of what was happening. In an era before radio and television, newspapers were the main source of information, opinion, and entertainment for the American public. In New York City, where the population was about 2,800,000, the combined circulation of daily papers was about 2,000,000.

In response to the public's outcry, McKinley took action against Spain. On April 25, the United States declared war and claimed to have had no self-serving interest in Cuba, but some political and military leaders and imperialists believed that war would be an opportunity for the United States to expand territories overseas and to demonstrate its increasing naval power against a weak foe. Moreover, the United States sought to expand economic ties with Cuba for its resources in sugar and tobacco, all of which influenced America's decision to intervene. It was evident that gaining territories across the globe would increase US strength and influence and tap markets for the products of American industry.

Spanish Prime Minister Práxedes Mateo Sagasta did not seek war with the United States. He did not expect victory but knew that Spanish citizens would likely revolt if he conceded to American demands in Cuba. Meanwhile, Spanish naval leaders tried to employ a strategy that would not win the war outright but resist the US Navy as much as possible. On May 1, 1898, American and Spanish naval forces met in the Philippines at the Battle of Manila Bay, which resulted in a decisive victory for the United States. The Spanish government sent their fleet, under Admiral Pascual Cervera y Topete, to defend Cuba and keep an open line of communication with the Spanish garrison there. Cervera opposed that strategy since he believed his squadron lacked the strength necessary to engage the American squadron. He preferred to engage the Americans near the Canary Islands or to mount an attack against the American coast, but he was overruled by his superiors in Madrid. Cervera's own misgivings reveal the seriousness of the situation faced:

It is impossible for me to give you an idea of the surprise and consternation experienced by all on the receipt of the order to sail. Indeed, that surprise is well justified, for nothing can be expected of this expedition except the total destruction of the fleet or its hasty and demoralized return.

Lacking a clear strategy, the Spanish policymakers at home may have hoped to end the war quickly in a "glorious defeat" against the more powerful US Navy. Cervera knew better but like a good officer followed orders to the letter. There is a hint of his real views in his attack orders to the fleet. He suggests they nail their flags to the masts; that is, not even to think about lowering them in surrender. As the fleet was being massacred against superior firepower, some captains in fact ran their ships aground and surrendered to save what was left of their men.

=== Spanish fleet ===
Before taking command of the Spanish Caribbean Squadron, Cervera had served a variety of military and political roles, then retired after a dispute with opposing politicians. However, when war against the United States broke, Cervera was recalled into the Spanish Navy and given command of the Caribbean Squadron. The squadron was to be dispatched from Spain with the ultimate destination of the Caribbean, initially Puerto Rico but then changed to Cuba, to reinforce the Spanish garrison, defend the island from American invasion, and break the American naval blockade. Before the outbreak of war, Cervera attempted to inform Spanish officials of the Spanish Navy's weakness relative to the US Navy. Captain Fernando Villaamil, the Second Officer in the Ministry of the Navy and a pioneer in destroyer warfare, disagreed with Cervera's passivity and advocated Spain to offset American naval superiority by scattering the fleet and taking the initiative through quick and dispersed actions. A lack of consensus between Cervera, Villaamil, and the Spanish government put Spanish naval strategy in flux from the beginning.

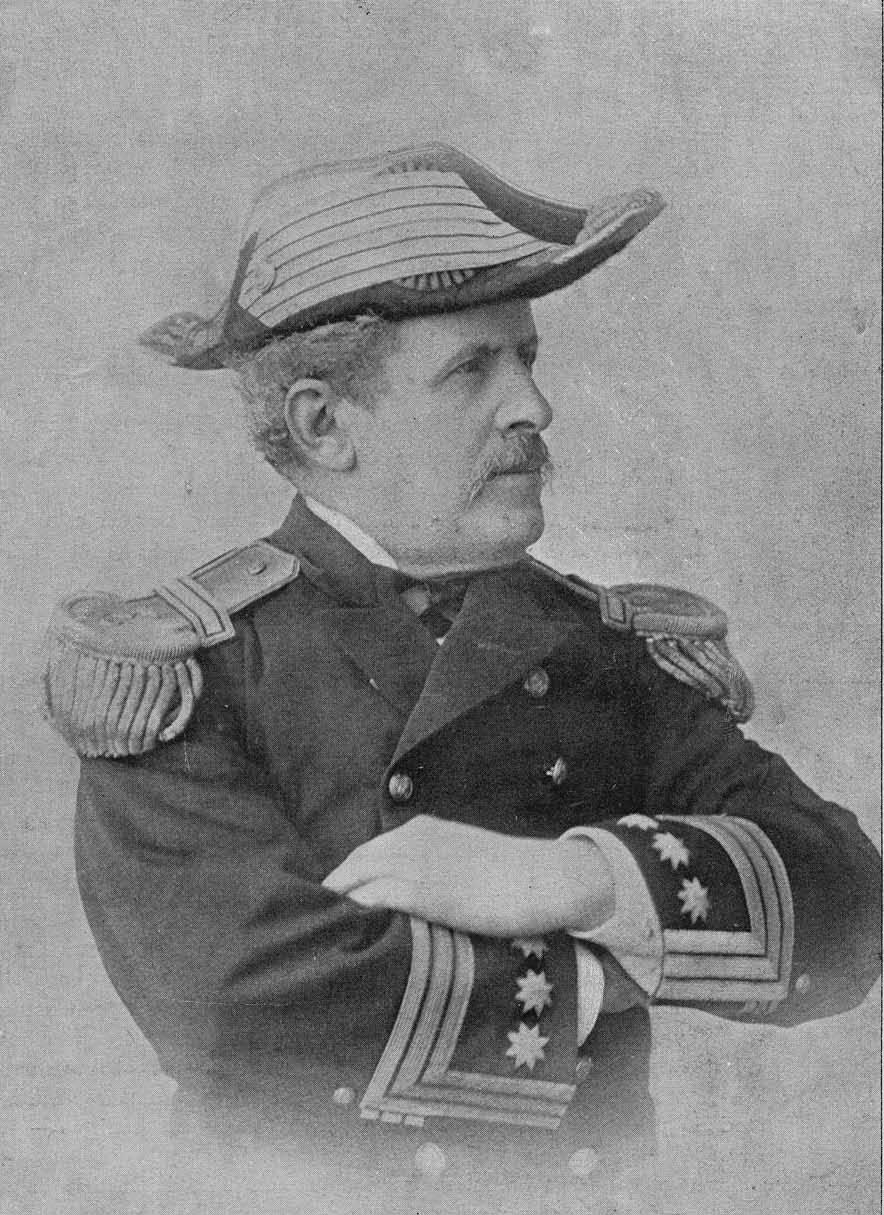
Fernando Villaamil, c.1897

On April 29, Cervera steamed from Cape Verde. Panic gripped the American people, who did not know what his ships might do: attack the largely-undefended East Coast while the fleet sailed about in an effort to engage him; prey upon American shipping; or perhaps sail up the Potomac and set fire to Washington, DC. Ultimately, Cervera did none of those but managed to evade the US fleet for several weeks, confounded his American counterparts, and recoaled in the process before he finally sought refuge in the harbor of Santiago de Cuba. On May 29, 1898, an American squadron sighted Cervera's newest ship, the cruiser Cristóbal Colón, and immediately established a blockade around the mouth of the harbor. The Spanish soon found themselves "blockaded closely by an American semicircle of ships about six miles from the Morro by day, and moving discreetly closer after nightfall." Moreover, by early July, the Spanish were nearly surrounded at Santiago from the east by an advancing American army numbering some 16,000 soldiers, 3,000 Cuban insurgents to the west, and the American fleet to the south.

The Spanish squadron consisted of the cruisers Almirante Oquendo, Vizcaya, Infanta Maria Teresa, and Cristóbal Colón in addition to Villaamil's destroyers Plutón and Furor. The cruisers displaced approximately 7,000 tons each, but they were not heavily armored, and their armament did not match the Americans. With the exception of Cristóbal Colón, which was more lightly armed, the cruisers' main armament consisted of two 11 in (279 mm) guns each and a secondary armament of ten 5.5 in (140 mm) guns. Cervera's fleet was at a further disadvantage relative to the Americans because of the condition of its ships. The breech mechanisms in many of the Spanish guns were dangerously faulty and caused jams and other mishaps. Many of the ships' boilers were in need of repair. Several ships, including Viscaya, desperately needed bottom-cleaning as they were suffering from extra drag from fouling. The most well-protected ship in Cervera's fleet, the second-generation armored cruiser Cristóbal Colón, had not even had her main battery installed and carried wooden dummy guns instead.

Finally, Cervera's crews were poorly trained. They lacked experience and practice in gunnery drills, and their training had emphasized rapid fire at regular intervals but the Americans favored more deliberately-aimed fire. Relative to the Americans' fleet, which consisted mainly of modern battleships, Cervera's force was lightly armed, a result of recent budget cuts but also a naval policy that for many years favored the construction of light swift ships to patrol the far-flung oceanic empire.

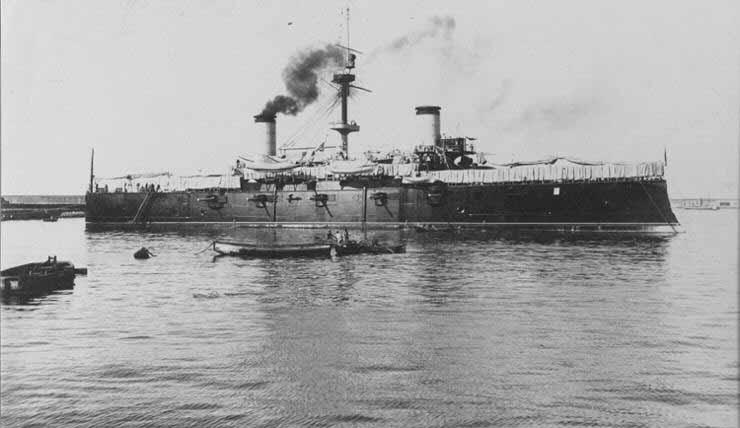
Spanish cruiser Cristóbal Colón

With Cervera's fleet bottled in Santiago, Captain General Ramon Blanco y Erenas, the top military commander in Cuba, ordered it to sortie from the harbor along the coast westward to Cienfuegos. In Cervera's eyes, escape from the bay seemed nearly impossible. He strongly considered fleeing under protection of night but opted to sail by day instead to ensure the safe navigation of his ships through Santiago's narrow channel. On July 3, 1898, Cervera, aboard his flagship Infanta Maria Teresa, led the Spanish fleet out of the safety of the Santiago harbor at 7 min intervals.

=== American fleet ===
The primary elements of the American forces in Cuban waters were initially divided between two commands: Rear Admiral William T. Sampson of the North Atlantic Squadron and Commodore Winfield Scott Schley, commanding the "Flying Squadron". Although the two combined squadrons outnumbered the Spanish fleet, victory was not achieved solely by American numerical superiority. Rather, victory resulted from strategic and tactical decisionmaking in addition to the general superiority of the American forces. As the historian James C. Rentfrow argues, the American victory at Santiago was, in many ways, the culmination of an "ongoing process towards [the North Atlantic Fleet's] construction as a combat unit."

At the head of the American fleet were Sampson's armored cruiser USS New York and Schley's armored cruiser USS Brooklyn. New York and Brooklyn, although only armored cruisers, were well-armed for their class. Schley's flagships were powerful cruisers, but the primary firepower of the American fleet resided in its battleships USS Indiana, USS Massachusetts, USS Iowa, and USS Texas. The American battleships were modern steam-powered and steel-hulled coast defense battleships all built within the decade. The oldest and least powerful of them was Texas, a near-sister ship to the Maine, which had exploded in Havana Harbor in February. The ships were armed with 12 in (305 mm) and 13 in (330 mm) guns and could steam at speeds up to 17 kn (31 km/h). Off Santiago, Schley's "Flying Squadron" was merged into the larger fleet under Sampson's overall command.

To bolster the force, US Navy Secretary John D. Long ordered the battleship USS Oregon to sail from Mare Island, California, to join the fleet in the Caribbean. The "West coast's lone battleship" steamed from San Francisco around Cape Horn to Key West to join the rest of Sampson's fleet in early May, a 14,500 nmi (26,854 km) journey completed in 66 days. The ship's armament included four 13-inch guns, eight 8 in (203 mm)/30 caliber guns, and 18 in (457 mm)-thick steel armor. With its 11,000 hp (8,203 kW) engines, it was propelled through the water at a rate upwards of 17 knots. Its combined speed and firepower gave Oregon the nickname "bulldog of the Navy." These "were clearly superior ships," observed W.J. Murphy, a sailor aboard Iowa. The powerful battleships, at least according to Murphy, enabled the US fleet to be victorious in battle.

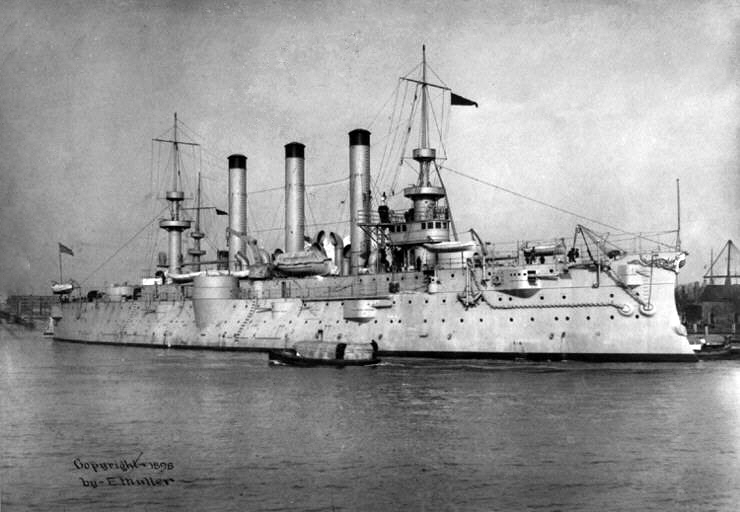
USS Brooklyn

Battleships and cruisers, however, were not the only forces the Americans employed in the conflict. Other vessels included torpedo boats like USS Porter, light cruisers such as USS New Orleans, and even the collier USS Merrimac, which sank on June 3. Sampson specifically approached Lieutenant Richmond P. Hobson, the commanding officer, charging him with the task to "sink the collier in the channel" in order to both blockade the Spanish fleet and to clear the narrow passage of any mines.

=== Standoff at Santiago ===
Sampson structured the blockade as a semicircle at the opening of the harbor. An auxiliary ship floated around the edges and waited to be used if a forced entrance was necessary, and a torpedo boat was stationed farther off the front line. The newly-developed torpedo boat was charged with guarding Sampson's flagship when he broke the blockade to perform "frequent inspections, attacks, and pursuits," according to a correspondent aboard the New York.

Except for the sinking of Merrimac, the duty proved tedious. "Blockade duty off the Cuban coast was long, dull and unremitting," wrote the historian Jim Leeke. During the day, the blockade stationed constant lookouts. At night, a battleship shone a searchlight on the entrance of the harbor if the Spanish fleet attempted an escape under the cover of darkness. The chore was repeated daily for nearly two months. As a sailor aboard USS Gloucester put it, "what at first had been a pleasure had become a duty."

As long as Cervera remained within Santiago Harbor, his fleet was relatively safe. The guns of the city were quite sufficient to make up for his fleet's deficiencies, and the area was well defended with sea mines, torpedoes, and other obstructions. Nevertheless, Cervera was terribly outmatched. Though his ships were modern, they were too few, and their technical problems compounded his worries. The lack of refitting facilities in Santiago to assist with the repairs of the vessels in Cervera's squadron made the situation all the more desperate.

For more than a month, the two fleets faced off, with only a few inconclusive skirmishes resulting. For his part, Cervera was content to wait in the hope that bad weather would scatter the Americans so that he could make a run to a position more favorable for engaging the enemy. However, US land forces began to drive on Santiago de Cuba, and by the end of June 1898, Cervera found himself unable to remain safely in the harbor, and Governor-General Ramón Blanco y Erenas wanted a sortie: "it is better for the honor of our arms that the squadron perish in battle...."

The breakout was planned for 09:00 on July 3. That seemed the most logical time: the Americans would be at religious services, and waiting until night would only make the escape even more treacherous. By noon on July 2, the fleet had a full head of steam and had fallen into position for the breakout.

At about 8:45 a.m., just as his ships had slipped their moorings, Admiral Sampson and two ships of his command, his flagship, the armored cruiser New York, and the torpedo boat USS Ericsson had left their positions for a trip to Siboney and a meeting with Major General William Rufus Shafter of the US Army. That opened a gap in the western portion of the American blockade line, which left a window for Cervera. Sampson's New York was one of only two ships in the squadron fast enough to catch Cervera if he managed to break through the blockade. Further, the battleship Massachusetts and the cruisers USS Newark and New Orleans had left that morning to coal at Guantanamo Bay.

With the departure of Admiral Sampson, who had signaled, "Disregard movements of flagship," immediate command devolved to Commodore Schley in armored cruiser Brooklyn, which now became the de facto flagship of the blockade.

Thus, the blockade formation that morning consisted of Schley's Brooklyn, followed by the battleships Texas, Oregon, Iowa, and Indiana and the armed yachts USS Vixen and Gloucester.

At 09:35, the navigator of Brooklyn sighted a plume of smoke coming from the mouth of the port and reported to Schley,

The enemy's ships are coming out!

== Battle ==
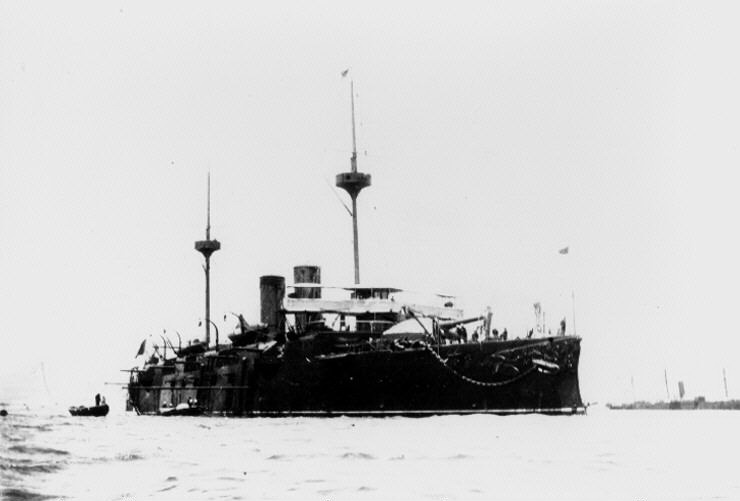
Infanta Maria Teresa at São Vicente

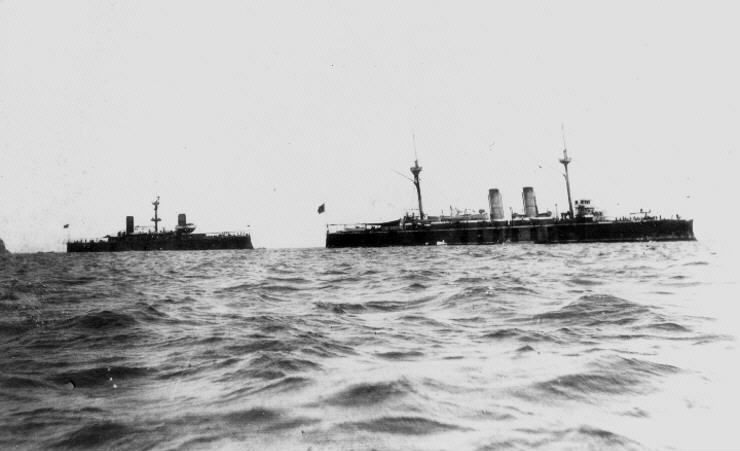
Cristóbal Colón (left) and Vizcaya

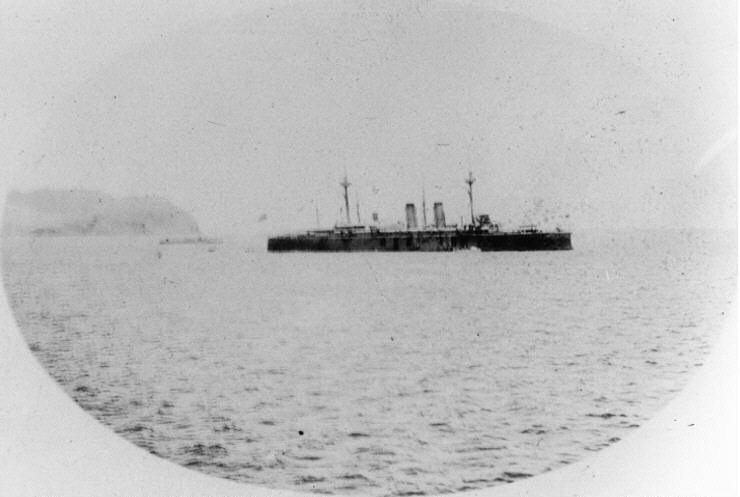
Almirante Oquendo at São Vicente in the latter half of April 1898.

Furor chased by Iowa, Indiana and New York

Ha llegado el momento solemne de lanzarse a la pelea. Así nos lo exige el sagrado nombre de España y el honor de su bandera gloriosa. He querido que asistáis conmigo a esta cita con el enemigo, luciendo el uniforme de gala. Sé que os extraña esta orden, porque es impropia en combate, pero es la ropa que vestimos los marinos de España en las grandes solemnidades, y no creo que haya momento mas solemne en la vida de un soldado que aquel en que se muere por la Patria. El enemigo codicia nuestros viejos y gloriosos cascos. Para ello ha enviado contra nosotros todo el poderío de su joven escuadra. Pero sólo las astillas de nuestras naves podrá tomar, y sólo podrá arrebatarnos nuestras armas cuando, cadáveres ya, flotemos sobre estas aguas, que han sido y son de España.
¡Hijos míos! El enemigo nos aventaja en fuerzas, pero no nos iguala en valor.
¡Clavad las banderas y ni un solo navío prisionero!
Dotación de mi escuadra: ¡Viva siempre España!
¡Zafarrancho de combate, y que el Señor acoja nuestras almas!

— Pascual Cervera y Topete's speech before the battle
Translation:

The solemn moment has arrived to launch into battle. The sacred name of Spain and the honor of her glorious flag demand it of us. I have asked you to attend this rendezvous with the enemy, wearing your full dress uniform. I know this order surprises you, for it is inappropriate in combat, but it is the attire we Spanish sailors wear on great occasions, and I believe there is no more solemn moment in a soldier's life than when he dies for his country. The enemy covets our old and glorious hulls. To this end, he has sent against us the full might of his young squadron. But he will only be able to take the splinters of our ships, and he will only be able to wrest our arms from us when, as corpses, we float upon these waters, which have been and are Spain's.
My sons! The enemy surpasses us in strength, but does not equal us in valor.
Fly the flags high and take not a single ship prisoner!
Crew of my squadron: Long live Spain!
Battle stations, and may the Lord welcome our souls!

The Spanish column made its way around Cay Smith (Cayo Granma) at around 9:31 a.m. on July 3 and left the channel about five minutes later. In the lead was Cervera's flagship Infanta Maria Teresa, followed by Vizcaya, Cristóbal Colón, Almirante Oquendo, travelling at around 8–10 kn (15–19 km/h) and 800 yd (730 m) apart, followed by the torpedo-boat destroyers Plutón and Furor, respectively. They then formed three echelons, the destroyers heading eastward, followed by Cristóbal Colón and Almirante Oquendo, and Infanta Maria Teresa and Vizcaya made for Brooklyn.

The battle commenced almost immediately. At the mouth of the harbor, the American vessels, Texas, Iowa, Oregon, and Indiana, engulfed the Spanish fleet in a "hail of fire." At 9:30 a.m., the first shot was fired by Iowa and Signal No. 250 was hoisted when the ships were seen in the channel. The Spanish responded, supported by the batteries on Morro and Upper Socapa. After leaving the channel, the Spanish vessels turned westward in column towards the American fleet.

While the Spanish had taken the initiative by beginning the engagement, two factors slowed their escape. One was the continuing problem experienced in maintaining proper speed by Vizcaya; the other was the poor quality of most of the coal in the Spanish holds. An expected resupply of high-quality anthracite had been captured aboard the collier Restormel, by the American auxiliary cruiser USS Saint Paul on May 25.

Brooklyn headed nearly straight for Infanta Maria Teresa at first, but by 10:05, it was apparent they were on a collision course, and Commodore Schley ordered a sharp turn to starboard, the so-called "retrograde loop," when all of the other American ships had already turned to port. That threatened Texas with collision and Captain Philip of Texas ordered "all engines back full," which brought Texas to a near standstill until Brooklyn passed across the bow of Texas. Infanta Maria Teresa and Vizcaya then altered course to the west, Cristóbal Colón and Almirante Oquendo falling in behind, and the two squadrons paralleled each other. Texas then swung behind Brooklyn, but Oregon then ran up on Texas and passed inboard, masking the fire of Texas. Oregon, initially to the rear of the action but the fastest ship in the US fleet, soon raced past Indiana, which had an engine problem and could go only 9 kn (17 km/h) at the time of the battle. Iowa had started from a disadvantaged position and was passed by Infanta Maria Teresa but hit her with two 12 in (300 mm) rounds from 2,600 yd (2,400 m) and swung into the chase. As Iowa was passed in turn by Cristóbal Colón, the Spanish ship hit her with two shots from her secondary battery. One of them struck near the waterline and caused Iowa to slow and she therefore engaged Almirante Oquendo, bringing up the rear of Cervera's four cruisers. With the Spanish fleet past the American blockade, the battle became a chase.

Rather than expose the entirety of his fleet to the American battle line, Cervera had signaled his other ships to continue to the southwest while he attempted to cover their escape by directly engaging Brooklyn, his nearest enemy. Though Brooklyn was hit more than 20 times during the battle, she suffered only two casualties, and her return fire resulted in the deaths of most of Cervera's bridge crew and grave damage to the ship generally. Under that brutal punishment, Infanta Maria Teresa began to burn furiously. According to Admiral Sampson's battle report, "it was afterward learned that the Infanta Maria Teresa's fire-main had been cut by one of [the] first shots." Cervera ordered her aground at 10:35 in shallows along the Cuban coast and had been completely wrecked and aflame. Admiral Cervera survived and was rescued after he had been picked up near Punta Cabrera by the crew of Gloucester.

The rest of the Spanish fleet continued its race for the open sea. Almirante Oquendo was hit a total of 57 times and was driven out of the battle by the premature detonation of a shell stuck in a defective breech-block mechanism of an 11-inch turret, which killed the entire gun crew. A boiler explosion finished her, and she was ordered scuttled by the mortally wounded Captain Lazaga. At 10:35 Almirante Oquendo ran aground no more than a mile beyond Infanta Maria Teresa. Meanwhile, Plutón and Furor made a dash in a direction opposite the rest of the Spanish squadron. Gloucester inflicted a considerable amount of damage by direct fire at close range to the destroyers, which eventually led to their destruction from the battleships Iowa, Indiana, and eventually New York. After receiving word of the battle, Sampson turned his flagship New York around and raced to join the fight. Furor was sunk at 10:50 before making the beach. Plutón succeeded in grounding herself at 10:45 near Cabanas Bay. In total, Furor and Plutón lost two thirds of their men.

Vizcaya was locked in a running gun duel for nearly an hour with Brooklyn. Despite steaming side by side with Schley's flagship at a range of about 1,200 yd (1,100 m) and even with some good shooting, which knocked out a secondary gun aboard Brooklyn, almost none of the Spaniards' nearly 300 shots caused significant damage, and Brooklyn pounded Vizcaya with devastating fire. Subsequent claims by Admiral Cervera and later research by historians have suggested that nearly 85% of the Spanish ammunition at Santiago was utterly useless, defective, or simply filled with sawdust as a cost-saving measure for practice firing. The American ammunition had no such issues of lethality. Vizcaya continued the fight until she was overwhelmed and by the end of the engagement, she had been struck as many as 200 times by the fire from Brooklyn and Texas. Brooklyn had closed to within 950 yd (870 m) when she finally delivered an 8 in (203 mm) round, which, according to witnesses, may have detonated a torpedo being prepared for launch. A huge explosion ensued, Vizcaya was mortally wounded, and fires raged out of control that burned her reserves of ammunition that were on deck. She hauled down her flag and turned toward the Aserraderos beach to ground herself at 11:15.

Schley signaled Indiana to go back to the harbor entrance, and Iowa was signaled to resume blockading station. Iowa, Ericsson, and Hist aided the crew of the burning Vizcaya. Meanwhile, Harvard and Gloucester rescued those of Infanta Maria Teresa and Almirante Oquendo. With flames and ready-to-explode ammunition on deck, the officers and sailors still ran into harm's way to rescue the Spanish crews. These proved to be some of the most valiant actions performed that day.

While Vizcaya was under fire, Cristóbal Colón had drawn ahead. Within a little more than an hour, five of the six ships of the Spanish Caribbean Squadron had been destroyed or forced aground. Only one vessel, the speedy new armored cruiser Cristóbal Colón, still survived and steamed as fast as she could for the west and freedom. Though modern in every respect and possibly the fastest ship in either fleet, Cristóbal Colón had one serious problem: she had been only recently purchased from Italy, and her main 10 in (254 mm) armament had not yet been installed because of a contractual issue with Armstrong Whitworth. She therefore sailed with empty main turrets but retained her ten 6 in (152 mm) secondary battery. That day, speed was her primary defense.

By the time Vizcaya had been beached, Cristóbal Colón was nearly six miles beyond Brooklyn and Oregon. At her best rate of nearly 15 kn (28 km/h), Cristóbal Colón slowly distanced herself from the pursuing US fleet. Her closest antagonist, USS Brooklyn, had begun the battle with just two of her four engines coupled because of her long stay on the blockade line, and she could manage barely 16 kn (30 km/h) while she was building steam. As Brooklyn ineffectively fired 8-inch rounds at the rapidly-disappearing Cristóbal Colón, there was only one ship in the US fleet with a chance of maintaining the pursuit, Oregon, burning Cardiff coal and New York, doing 20 kn (37 km/h).

Vizcaya's wreck after the battle

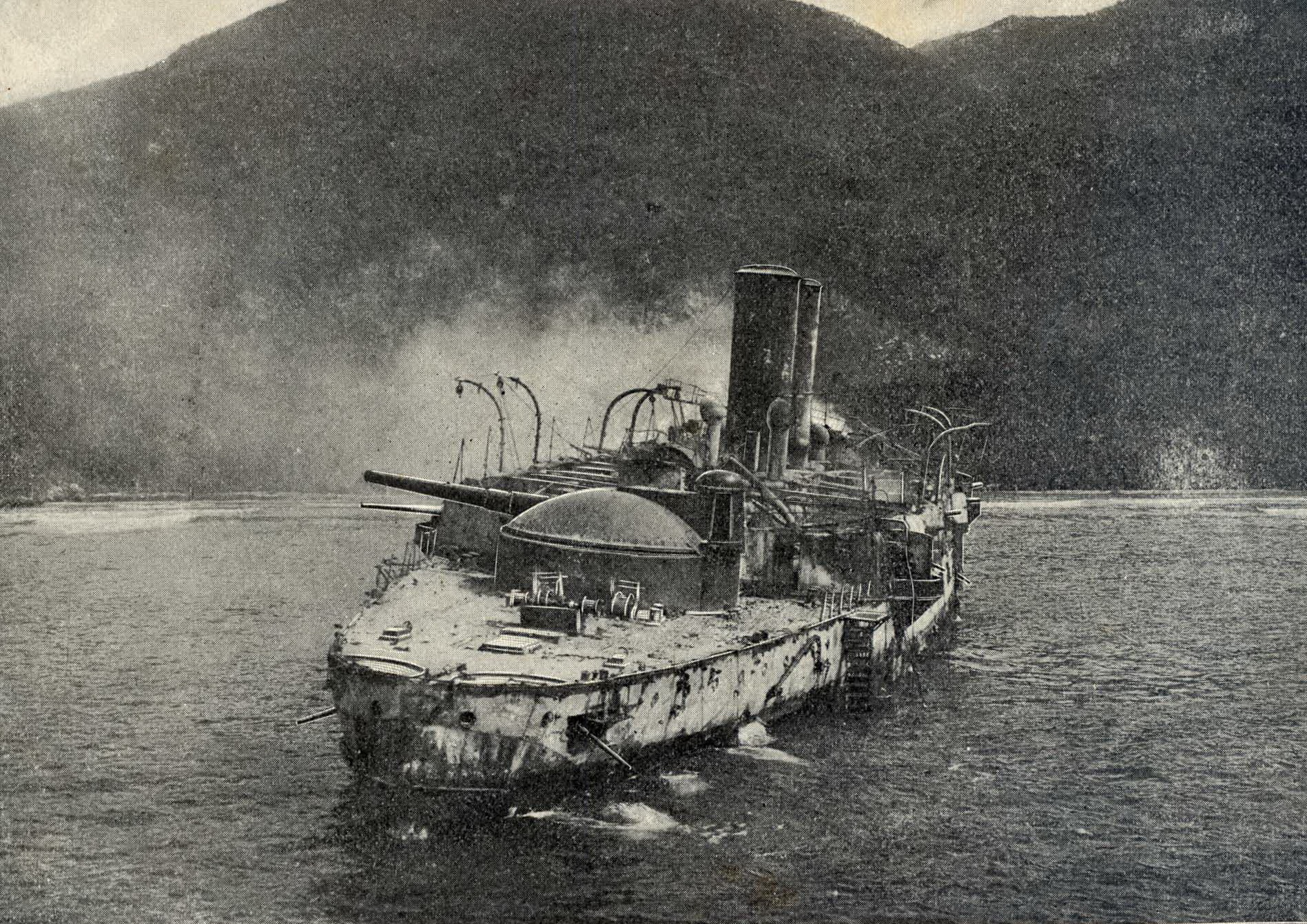
Almirante Oquendo's wreck after the battle

For 65 min, Oregon pursued Cristóbal Colón. which hugged the coast and was unable to turn toward the open sea because Oregon was standing out about 1.5 mi (1.3 nmi; 2.4 km) from the course of Cristóbal Colón and would have been able to close the gap fatally of Cristóbal Colón had turned to a more southerly course.

Finally, three factors converged to end the chase. Cristóbal Colón had run through her supply of high-quality Cardiff coal and was forced to begin using an inferior grade obtained from Spanish reserves in Cuba. Also, a peninsula jutting out from the coastline would soon force her to turn south, across Oregon's path. Finally, on the flagship Brooklyn, Commodore Schley signaled Oregon Captain Charles Edgar Clark to open fire. Despite the immense range still separating Oregon and Cristóbal Colón, the forward turret of Oregon launched a pair of 13-inch shells that bracketed the wake of Cristóbal Colón just astern of the ship.

Vizcaya explodes

Vizcaya exploded at 1:20 p.m., Captain Jose de Paredes, declining to see his crew needlessly killed, abruptly turned the Cristóbal Colón toward the mouth of the Turquino River and ordered the scuttle valves opened and the colors struck as she grounded. Captain Cook of Brooklyn went on board to receive the surrender. Oregon was in charge of the wreck of Cristóbal Colón with orders to save her if possible. All of the prisoners were to be transferred to USS Resolute. Despite all efforts, Cristóbal Colón was taken by the sea and sank in shoal water. As the ships of the US fleet pushed through the carnage and rescued as many Spanish survivors as possible, one officer was fished out by sailors of Iowa. The man proved to be Captain Don Antonio Eulate of Vizcaya. He thanked his rescuers and presented his sword to Captain Robley Evans, who handed it back as an act of chivalry.

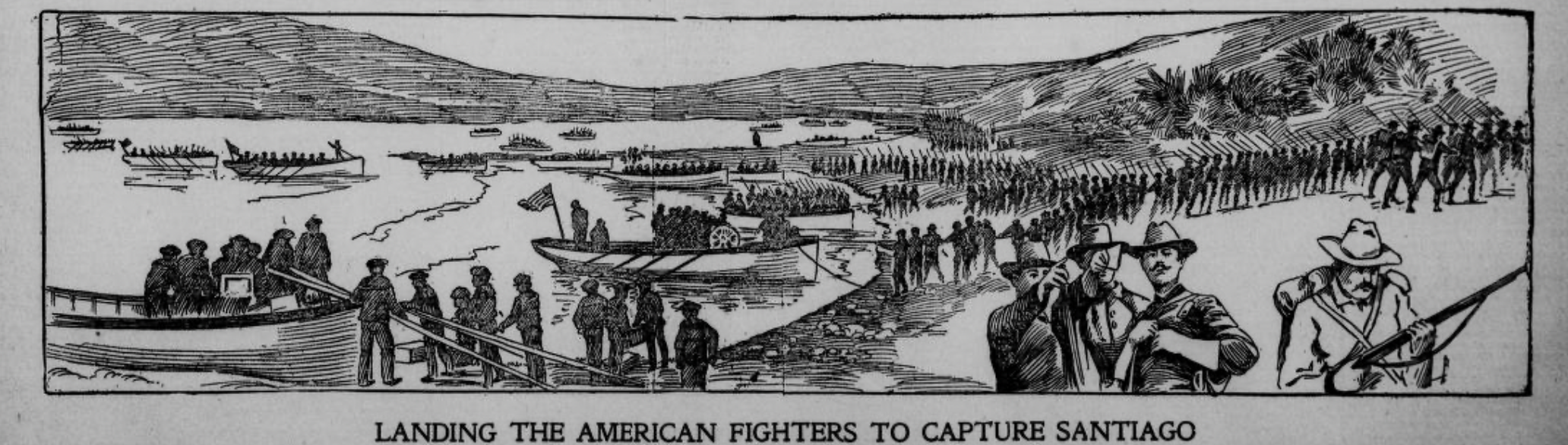
American troops landing at Santiago after the battle

By the end of the battle, the Spanish fleet had been completely destroyed. The Spanish lost more than 300 killed and 150 wounded out of 2,227 men, or approximately 22% of the fleet. 1,800 officers and men were taken prisoner by the Americans, and roughly 150 returned to Santiago de Cuba. The American fleet lost only one killed and one wounded, the former being Yeoman George Henry Ellis of the Brooklyn. The Spanish ships were devastated by the overwhelming barrage of firepower by the Americans. However, according to historian David Trask, despite the overwhelming victory, only 1–3% of all rounds fired by the Americans found their mark.

== Sampson-Schley controversy ==
The American victory bred controversy in the ranks of the naval officer corps over the question of the commanding officer who deserved credit for the victory. Should it be Sampson, who was in operational command of the fleet, but absent when Cervera's force engaged the Americans, or Schley, who remained in tactical command during Sampson's absence and who saw the fight to a successful close from the bridge of Brooklyn? The controversy between the two officers began almost immediately after the conclusion of the battle. At the conclusion of the battle, Sampson's flagship New York approached Brooklyn. Schley sent the message by signal flag: "The enemy has surrendered" and "We have gained a great victory." Against common practice at the end of a victorious battle, Sampson did not respond with the expected congratulatory remark, but rather, according to historian Joseph G. Dawson, "the answering signal was terse and seemed needlessly brusque." After the messages were exchanged, more tension grew between the two officers when Schley requested for he and his crew to "have the honor of the surrender of the Cristobal Colon." With disregard to Schley and the other commanding officers, Sampson cabled Secretary Long, "The fleet under my command offers the nation as a Fourth of July present the whole of Cevera’s fleet." He invoked General William T. Sherman's message to President Abraham Lincoln after taking Atlanta in 1864 but made no reference to Schley. A day after the news reached the United States, The New York Times published an article with the headline "Sampson's Fourth of July Victory," which expressed gratitude towards Sampson for his leadership during the battle. In Sampson's hometown of Palmyra, New York, a respectful 100 shots were fired for his victory. Following the newspaper headlines were interviews and telegraphs from Sampson's wife, sister, and two sons. Each message displayed praise and congratulations for his accomplishments in the battle.

Less than two weeks before Sampson's battle report was due, reporters sensed that there was tension between the two officers. On July 5, Kentucky Representative Albert S. Berry went on record in favor of Schley by declaring, "Schley is the real hero of the incident. Sampson commands the fleet in those waters, but it was Commodore Schley in command when Cervera and his fleet made the plucky attempt at escape and it was under Schley that every one of that Spanish fleet met its destruction." Berry still did not impugn Sampson but believed that Schley deserved much of the credit for the American victory. The next day, a news report from the Baltimore American declared that "Schley [was] the real hero."

The controversy quickly became a public spectacle inflamed by journalistic sensationalism, popular interest in the recent war, and in the war's celebration of military heroism. On August 9, 1898, the Springfield Republic claimed the controversy to be largely a product of writers determined "to get a brilliant hero out of the Santiago battle at any cost." Many journalists felt that Sampson's "careful, thorough and comprehensive leadership" did not fit the mold of the brash American hero in the era of Rooseveltian masculinity. Just as early motion picture-makers such as Thomas Edison made films celebrating Schley's leadership at Santiago, journalists by and large placed Schley on a pedestal for winning the battle because he was the man standing on the bridge who led the fleet towards the enemy and victory in combat.

The controversy also sharply divided the Navy's officer corps. Alfred Thayer Mahan, author of The Influence of Sea Power upon History: 1660–1783, threw his considerable influence behind Sampson. He argued that it did not matter who was in command during the battle because the "stringent methods laid down" by Sampson brought about the ultimate victory. In Mahan's eyes, the press and the public were robbing Sampson of the credit that he deserved since it was through his overall command that Schley had the means to defeat the enemy.

Within the Navy, the controversy sharpened when Long proposed promotions for the two officers. Prior to the war, both men had held the rank of captain, and both men were promoted to rear admiral to reflect their wartime commands. After the war, Long proposed for both officers to be promoted to vice admiral. Sampson had ranked number ten in the Naval Register and Schley ranked number eight. Upon promotion, Sampson would be moved eight numbers up and Schley only six and would rank Sampson higher in the register than Schley. Alexander McClure, editor of the Philadelphia Times, warned President McKinley that the promotion of Sampson over Schley would be a "great injustice" in the eyes of the public. His warning was ignored, and the promotion of Sampson over Schley became permanent on March 3, 1899.

Shortly thereafter, The New York Sun published an article that quoted Brooklyn's navigator, Lieutenant Commander Albon C. Hodgson, as saying that Schley gave orders to turn "hard aport" when first met by the Spanish fleet. That turn, in which Brooklyn had nearly collided with the battleship Texas, was a key critique of Schley's antagonist that Sampson and his supporters had been using to construct an argument of cowardice against Schley. Hodgson asked if he meant to starboard, and Schley replied "no." According to that testimony, Schley apparently said "damn the Texas; let her look out for herself!" Schley, denying any such remark, requested for Hodgson to write a formal statement retracting his accusations. He pointed out that such a statement would damage the reputation of not only Schley but also Hodgson. The latter complied and retracted his statement but requested Schley to write a statement explaining why he retracted his claim. Schley did not answer that request.

Long grew increasingly frustrated by the issue and its detrimental effects within the service. In November 1899, he ordered all officers to refrain from discussing the matter in public. However, debate continued in private, and those against Schley "were determined to destroy his reputation through a court of inquiry" that would investigate Schley's actions and ultimately give credit to the appropriate officer. Schley had nothing to gain from a court of inquiry but was forced to seek a hearing on his own accord in order to clear his name. Outraged by the publication of Edgar S. Maclay's History of the United States Navy, which Schley supporters deemed slanderous to the admiral's reputation, Schley sought and received the court of inquiry.

A court of inquiry opened on September 12, 1901 at the Washington Navy Yard to investigate 24 charges against Schley from his search for Cervera off Cienfuegos to the conclusion of the Battle of Santiago de Cuba. Contrary to public opinion, the court concluded after 40 days of deliberations closely followed by the public and the press that Schley did not "project the right image of a naval officer" because of his failure to act "decisively between his departure from Key West to the time of the battle." In the court's findings, Schley was criticized for his route to the battle and for possibly endangering the Texas. It also referenced the "injustice to Lt. Cmdr. Hodgson when he published only a portion of the correspondence that passed between the officers about the matter." Admiral George Dewey, president of the court of inquiry and a so-called supporter of Schley, offered a dissenting opinion.

Disappointed with the court's conclusions, Schley appealed his case to President Theodore Roosevelt. The president called for an end to all public disputes. Tensions died down temporarily, but arose after the publication of Long's personal memoir in which the former secretary of the navy credited Sampson fully and believed that Schley contributed little to the battle's outcome. Sampson died in 1902 and Schley in 1911, but the controversy left an internecine struggle within the Navy that in some ways tarnished its image after what had otherwise seemed a glorious naval victory.

== Aftermath ==
The end of the Spanish–American War was in many ways a new beginning for the US Navy and marked a watershed moment in American and Spanish history. The defeat of the Spanish Navy gave the US nearly uncontested control of the seas surrounding Cuba. With resupply of the Spanish garrison nearly impossible, Spain ultimately sued for peace and surrendered in August, and the war was over. Some of the terms of surrender were as follows:

3. Que los Estados Unidos convienen en transportar todas las fuerzas españolas en dicho territorio al Reino de España con la menor demora posible… [That the United States agrees to carry all Spanish forces in that territory to the Kingdom of Spain with the least possible delay...]

5. Las autoridades españoles convienen en quitar, o ayudar a que sean quitadas por la Marina americana, todas las minas y demás entorpecimientos a la navegación que existen ahora en la bahía de Santiago de Cuba y su entrada. [The Spanish authorities agree to remove or help to remove with the American Navy, all mines or other obstructions to navigation that now exist in the Bay of Santiago de Cuba and its entrance.]

9. Que las fuerzas españolas saldrán de Santiago de Cuba con honores de guerra, depositando después sus armas en un lugar mutuamente convenido... [That the Spanish forces will leave Santiago de Cuba with the honors of war, afterwards depositing their weapons in a mutually agreed-upon place...]

The terms, upon which both sides came to an agreement during the 1898 Treaty of Paris (1898) negotiations, decided the fate of the remaining Spanish troops, vessels, and the matter of Cuba's sovereignty. Spanish prisoners-of-war who were not wounded were sent to Seavey's Island at the Portsmouth Naval Shipyard in Kittery, Maine, where they were confined at Camp Long from July to September 1898. The Americans treated Spain's officers, soldiers, and sailors with great respect. Ultimately, Spanish prisoners were returned to Spain with their "honors of war" on American ships.

The battle was the end of any noteworthy Spanish naval presence in the New World. It forced Spain to reassess its strategy in Cuba and resulted in an ever-tightening blockade of the island. Fighting continued until August. When the Treaty of Paris was signed, all surviving Spanish capital ships were now husbanded to defend their homeland and left only isolated units of auxiliary vessels to defend the coast. Uncontested US control of the seas around Cuba made resupply of the Spanish garrison impossible and its surrender inevitable. Admiral Cervera received different treatment from the sailors taken to Portsmouth. For a time, he was held at Annapolis, Maryland, where he was received with great enthusiasm by the people of that city. The Battle of Santiago de Cuba brought Cervera peace of mind that he had fulfilled an officer's duties and that his fleet had upheld Spanish honor. His bravery in the face of the enemy's superiority garnered respect from Spanish and American sailors and officers alike. The Spanish prisoners-of-war were released upon the signing of the 1898 Treaty of Paris, and the remaining Spanish forces left Cuba. Civil order was left to the military government that the United States established. The US Army under the overall administration of General Leonard Wood governed the island for some time afterwards and, with help, removed many of the mines that had been laid in the bay.

In the imperial vacuum left by Spain's New World empire, the United States now exerted considerable influence both in annexing formal territories such as Puerto Rico, Guam, and the Philippines and in subsequent American military interventions throughout the Caribbean over the next half-century.

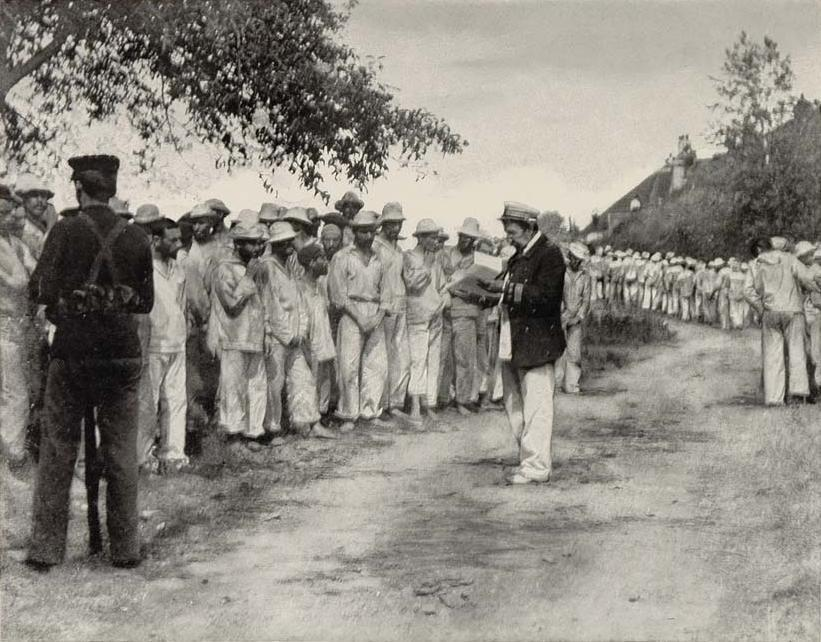
Spanish Navy POWs at Seavey's Island

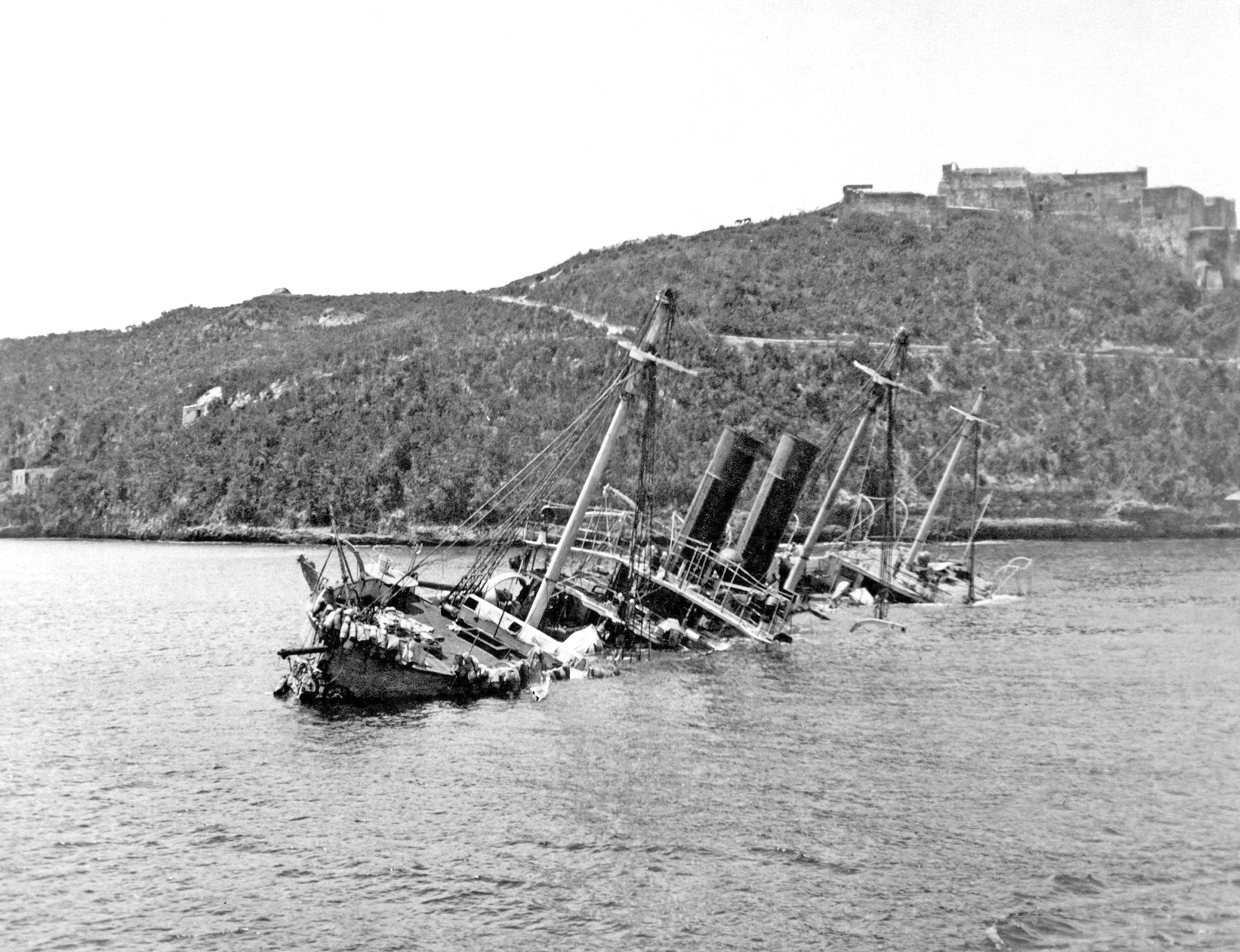
The sunken Reina Mercedes in the channel at Santiago de Cuba.

The late 19th century was a transitional period for the US Navy and for the growth of American power. The war and the conquest of territory seemed to validate American navalism and tipped the scale of US naval policy towards the full embrace of Mahanian sea power. The Spanish–American War and subsequent interventions in Latin America known collectively as the Banana Wars were indicative of American commitment to the Monroe Doctrine articulated by the Roosevelt Corollary, which committed the United States, through the Navy and Marine Corps particularly, to be an international police force in the Western Hemisphere.

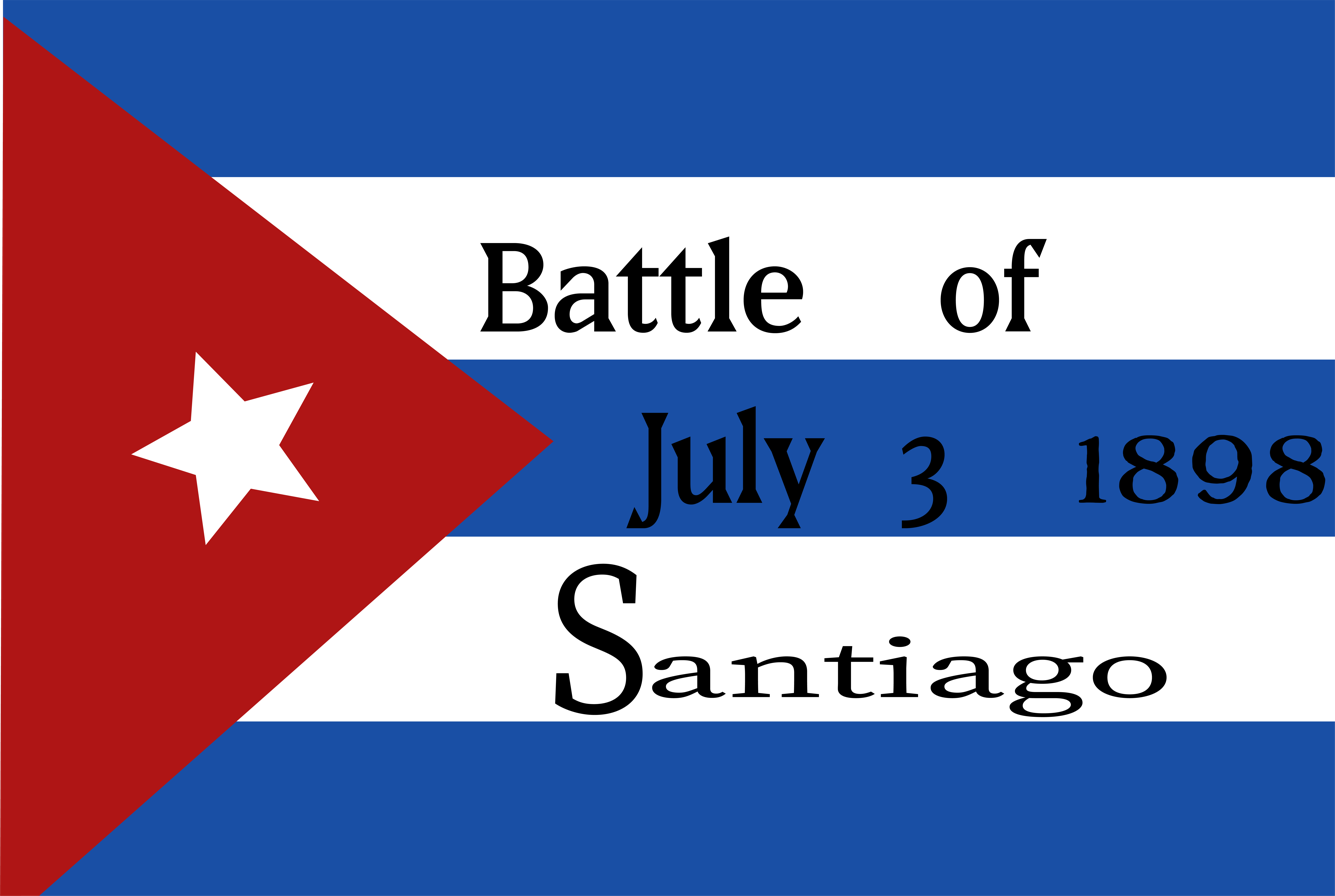
Digital remake of a flag made to after the battle

Imperialist sentiments followed the victory of the US Navy and the newfound celebrity status of some of its commanders. Part of the impetus for new territorial expansion was the need for foreign naval bases and the need for a larger navy to take and maintain control of such bases. The Philippines, Guam, Puerto Rico, and others had become locations for US overseas naval bases and coaling stations, but native resistance remained high. The resistance in the Philippines developed into a colonial war between local guerrillas and US forces under Major General Elwell S. Otis, who was appointed military governor of the Philippines after the Spanish–American War. The territorial conflict was ironic because the roles of the Spanish–American War were now reversed. The US had fought to free Cuba from Spain's colonial power but now aimed to colonize the Philippines. Ultimately, the Spanish–American War brought to light deeply rooted conflicts between the principles of democracy and the urges of American imperialism.

Two of the Spanish ships, Infanta Maria Teresa and Cristóbal Colón, were later re-floated and taken over by the US. Both eventually foundered and were lost. Reina Mercedes, abandoned in Santiago Bay because of engine troubles, was an unprotected cruiser captured by the US Navy and used as a receiving ship until 1957 as USS Reina Mercedes.

All of the various flags, warship pennants, national combat flags, the royal standard, admirals' flags, and so on retrieved from the Spanish ships in the days following the battle are part of the United States Navy Trophy Flag Collection at the U.S. Naval Academy Museum in Annapolis, Maryland. The collection was given to the care of the US Naval Academy by an act of Congress in 1949.

In 1998, in recognition of the hundredth anniversary of the battle and the Spanish–American War, the US Secretary of the Navy authorized the return of the National Combat Flag from the Spanish flagship Infanta Maria Teresa to the Spanish Navy via their Chief of Staff, who was to meet with the US Navy Chief of Naval Operations in Newport, Rhode Island. However, the return of the flag was aborted when the curator of the Naval Academy Museum, citing the congressional language from 1949, refused to surrender the banner.
