= Flying Squadron (United States Navy) =

Military unit of the United States Navy

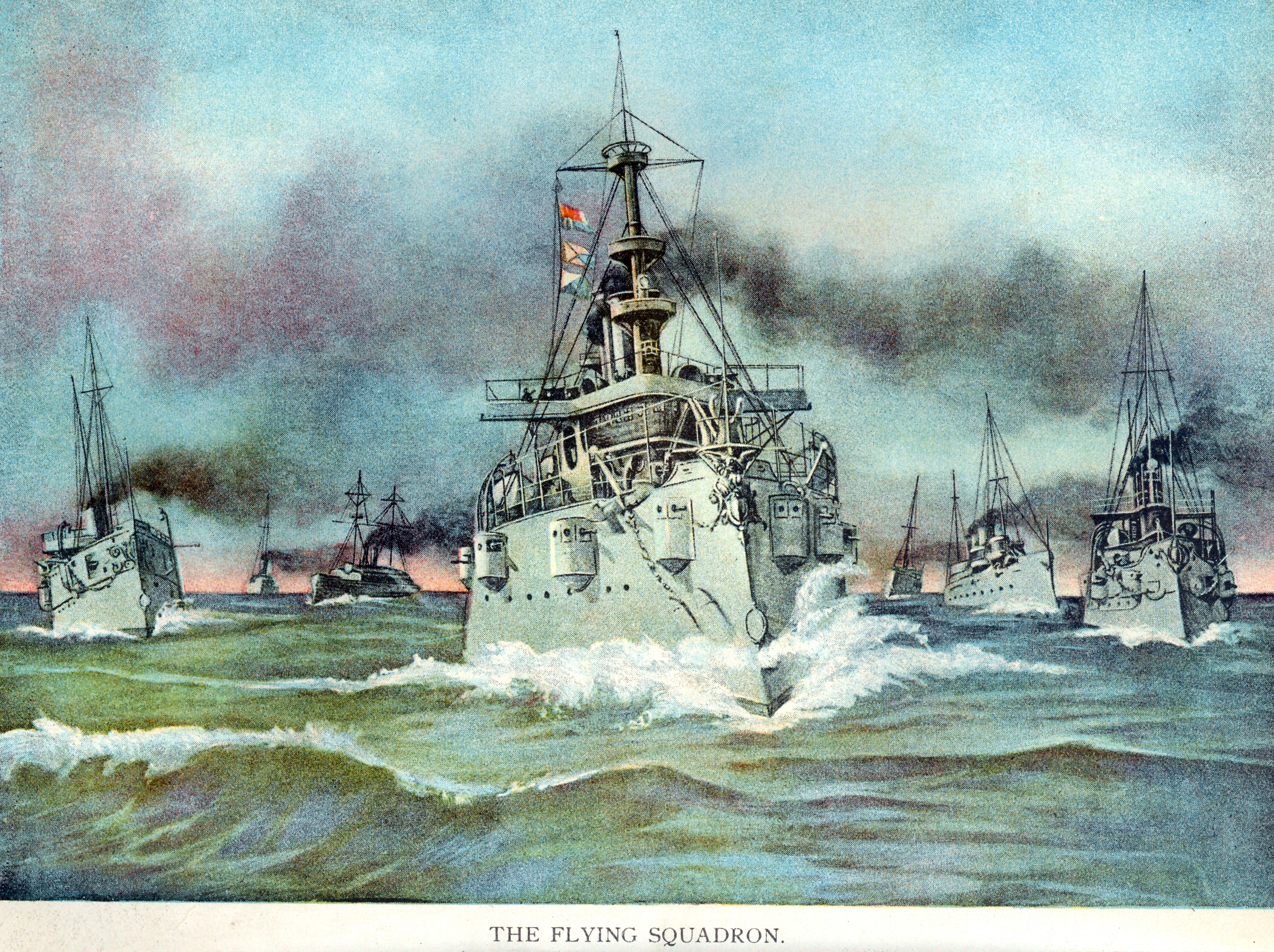
- An illustration of the Flying Squadron, 1898.
- Active: April–June 1898
- Country: United States
- Branch: United States Navy
- Type: Naval squadron

The Flying Squadron was a United States Navy force that operated in the Atlantic Ocean, the Gulf of Mexico and the Spanish West Indies during the first half of the Spanish–American War. The squadron included many of America's most modern warships which engaged the Spanish in a blockade of Cuba.

== Spanish–American War ==
=== Formation ===
In the spring of 1898, tensions were rising between the United States and Spain over events in Cuba, particularly the explosion and sinking of the armored cruiser USS Maine (often referred to as a "battleship") in Havana Harbor. Although the United States Navy's leadership preferred to concentrate its fleet at Key West, Florida, for operations against Cuba and Puerto Rico in the event of war, the American public and United States Government feared that a Spanish Navy squadron might cross the Atlantic from Spain and raid the East Coast of the United States.

The political pressure to establish a visible naval defense of the East Coast forced the U.S. Navy to reorganize itself to address the public's concerns. Accordingly, in April 1898, shortly before the outbreak of war, the United States Department of the Navy ordered the fleet to be divided.

The heavy units of the U.S. fleet formed the North Atlantic Squadron, commanded by Rear Admiral William T. Sampson, which was concentrating at Key West. The new organizational scheme imposed by the Department of the Navy transferred about half of that squadron's ships to a new Flying Squadron under the command of Commodore Winfield S. Schley, consisting of the battleships Texas and Massachusetts, the armored cruiser Brooklyn, the protected cruisers Columbia and Minneapolis, and several auxiliary cruisers; Schley's flagship was Brooklyn. While the North Atlantic Squadron operated in the Caribbean Sea and Gulf of Mexico in support of the efforts of smaller U.S. ships blockading Cuba and Puerto Rico, the Flying Squadron would be based at Hampton Roads, Virginia, poised to defend the Atlantic coast against Spanish naval attack.

=== Operations from Hampton Roads ===
The Spanish Navy's First Squadron, commanded by Vice Admiral Pascual Cervera y Topete, meanwhile began to concentrate at Sao Vicente in Portugal's Cape Verde Islands in April 1898, where it was when war broke out later in the month. It sortied from Sao Vicente on 29 April 1898, secretly bound for San Juan, Puerto Rico, which the United States Navy assumed was its destination. But Cervera's departure and the lack of information thereafter about his squadron's whereabouts caused a panic on the U.S. East Coast, where hysterical press reports of the potential devastation that Spanish naval guns could wreak on U.S. coastal cities fed people's fears. Against its wishes, the Navy recommissioned eight old monitors of American Civil War vintage and questionable fighting value and deployed them in major ports, and the Flying Squadron was tied down at Hampton Roads until Cervera's location and intentions could be determined.

The situation clarified on 10 May 1898, when Cervera's ships appeared in the Caribbean off Martinique, seeking coal at Fort-de-France. With Cervera now firmly committed to the Caribbean, Schley was ordered to shift the Flying Squadron's base from Hampton Roads to Key West, from which base it could hunt actively for the Spanish squadron while Sampson's North Atlantic Squadron continued its overall blockade support mission in the theater.

=== Search for Cervera's squadron ===
The Flying Squadron departed Hampton Roads for Key West on 13 May 1898. Meanwhile, Cervera's quest for coal had forced him to move from Martinique to call at Willemstad in Curaçao. After he departed Curaçao, the U.S. Department of the Navy received faulty intelligence information that Cervera had with him a number of cargo ships, leading the Navy Department to conclude that he was bound for Cienfuegos, a port on Cuba's south coast which was a good choice for unloading military supplies for Spanish forces. On 18 May 1898, the Navy ordered Schley to blockade Cienfuegos, and the Flying Squadron sortied from Key West on this mission at 07:00 on 19 May 1898, arriving off Cienfuegos on the afternoon of 21 May 1898.

At 07:00 on 19 May 1898, two hours after the Flying Squadron left Key West, Cervera arrived undetected at Santiago de Cuba, on Cuba's southeastern coast, only an hour after the auxiliary cruiser USS St. Louis had reconnoitered the harbor, found it empty, reported Cervera's absence, and departed. Navy Department officials, aware of the report from St. Louis and still thinking that Cervera had cargo ships with him and was either at or en route to Cienfuegos, doubted telegrams reporting his arrival at Santiago de Cuba. On 20 May 1898, however, United States Secretary of the Navy John D. Long came across intelligence information that seemed to make the possibility of Cervera's presence at Santiago de Cuba more credible, and cabled Sampson at Key West with instructions to inform Schley accordingly.

Sampson, who still thought that Cervera was at Cienfuegos and interpreted Long's cable as advisory rather than directive, ordered Schley and the Flying Squadron to continue to Cienfuegos and remain there. For his part, Schley, his squadron's view of Cienfuegos harbor apparently an obstructed one, could not confirm whether or not Cervera's squadron was at Cienfuegos. Correct information Schley received on 19 May 1898 from a passing neutral merchant ship that Cervera was at Santiago de Cuba was cancelled out by the same ship's false report that Cervera had departed Santiago de Cuba on 20 May. For all Schley knew, Cervera could have slipped into Cienfuegos sometime between 20 May 1898 and the Flying Squadron's arrival there the next afternoon.

On 21 May 1898, the Navy Department received intelligence information confirming that Cervera's ships were at Santiago de Cuba, and cabled Sampson at Key West. Sampson sent the information to Schley by despatch boat, which Schley received about 24 hours later, on 22 May 1898. Sampson's orders, however, left much up to Schley's assessment of the situation at Cienfuegos; Sampson told Schley to take the Flying Squadron to Santiago de Cuba if he was satisfied that Cervera indeed was not at Cienfuegos, something which Schley had not yet been able to confirm. Schley opted to keep the Flying Squadron off Cienfuegos.

On 23 May 1898, repeated light displays during the evening from the hills above Cienfuegos drew the attention of Flying Squadron lookouts. Not until the next day were they identified as secret signals from Cuban insurgents. Commander Bowman H. McCalla, commanding officer of the unprotected cruiser Marblehead, went ashore on the morning of 24 May 1898 and learned from the insurgents that Cervera's squadron was at Santiago de Cuba. He returned to the squadron and informed Schley later that day. Schley, who still believed that Cervera might be at Cienfuegos, ordered the Flying Squadron to move to Santiago de Cuba to see if Cervera was there.

At 07:55 on 25 May 1898, the Flying Squadron began its voyage to Santiago de Cuba, moving at a leisurely pace because of the low maximum speed of some of its ships. At 17:25 on 26 May 1898, it hove to 25 to 30 nautical miles (29 to 35 mi; 46 to 56 km) south of Santiago de Cuba to receive reports from cruisers that had been scouting the area. The commanding officer of one of them, Captain Charles D. Sigsbee of the auxiliary cruiser USS St. Paul, incorrectly reported that Cervera was not at Santiago de Cuba, based both on his own observation of the harbor over the past week and incorrect information gleaned from the captain of a Spanish collier St. Paul had intercepted.

Sigsbee's report confirmed Schley's doubts about Cervera being at Santiago de Cuba, and at around 18:00 Schley ordered the Flying Squadron to reverse course and steam westward south of Cuba, passing Cienfuegos en route Key West, where the squadron would coal. But at about 20:00, the conflict in Schley's mind between his own conviction that Cervera was at Cienfuegos and Sampson's orders to move to Santiago de Cuba led him to order the Flying Squadron to heave to once more. It drifted westward with the current overnight and all the next morning, some of the ships taking on coal. At 12:00 on 27 May 1898, Schley ordered it to resume its voyage to Key West. Abruptly, at 13:25, Schley had a change of heart, and ordered the Flying Squadron to again reverse course and steam east for Santiago de Cuba, off which it arrived at 19:40 on 27 May 1898.

At dawn on 28 May 1898, the Flying Squadron saw that the Spanish armored cruiser Cristóbal Colón was anchored in the entrance channel under the guns of the harbor's coastal fortifications. This finally confirmed that Cervera's squadron, missing for 13 days since its departure from Curaçao, was at Santiago de Cuba.

=== Blockade of Santiago de Cuba ===
Schley sent word of Cervera's whereabouts to Samspon and the Flying Squadron established a blockade of Santiago de Cuba. On 30 May 1898, Secretary Long ordered Schley to "hold on at all hazards" and informed him that Sampson had set out with units of the North Atlantic Squadron to reinforce the Flying Squadron.

At 14:00 on 31 May 1898, Schley had the Flying Squadron make its first offensive move, sending the battleships Iowa and Massachusetts and the protected cruiser New Orleans in to bombard Cristóbal Colón and the coastal forts. The two sides exchanged fire at the extreme range (by 1898 standards) of 7,000 yards (6,400 m) without any results. The American ships ceased fire at about 14:10, although the Spanish continued firing until about 15:00.

Sampson arrived on 1 June 1898 aboard his flagship, the armored cruiser New York, bringing with him the battleship Oregon, the armed yacht Mayflower, and the torpedo boat Porter of the North Atlantic Squadron. This created an awkward command arrangement in which Sampson, who had a substantive rank of captain in peacetime but a temporary rank of rear admiral during the war, became overall commander off Santiago de Cuba. Schley, who was a commodore and senior to Sampson in the Navy but temporarily of lower rank, became second-in-command. It also created a situation in which elements of two squadrons, North Atlantic and Flying, operated together off Santiago de Cuba under the two awkwardly juxtaposed flag officers. This led to friction and some confusion during the blockade.

The blockade was to drag on for 37 days. But Sampson was more aggressive than Schley, and immediately set a plan in motion to block the harbor's entrance channel using the collier USS Merrimac as a blockship. Attempted on 3 June 1898, the plan went awry when Merrimac sank in a location that did not block passage through the harbor entrance. On 6 June 1898, the blockading squadrons conducted a major bombardment of the coastal forts and Spanish ships in the harbor.

=== Disbandment ===
During the blockade of Santiago de Cuba, a new Spanish threat arose in mid-June 1898, when the Spanish Navy's 2nd Squadron, under Rear Admiral Manuel de Camara, left Spain for the Philippines to attack the U.S. Navy Asiatic Squadron under Commodore George Dewey there. To force Spain to recall Camara to Spanish waters, the Department of the Navy developed a plan for a United States Navy squadron to raid the Spanish coast. The plan to raid the Spanish coast lead to a reorganization of the U.S. fleet in which the Flying Squadron was abolished on 18 June 1898. Schley was reassigned as commander of a new Second North Atlantic Squadron.

The dissolution of the Flying Squadron made little practical difference in the waters off Santiago de Cuba, where the blockade continued until 3 July 1898 with the ships of the former Flying Squadron on duty and Schley present as second-in-command of the blockade under Sampson. And, in the end, no raid on the Spanish coast ever took place; Camara was recalled to Spain without reaching the Philippines after the disastrous defeat of Cervera's squadron in the Battle of Santiago de Cuba fifteen days after the Flying Squadron was dissolved.

== Postwar evaluation ==
Schley was a respected naval officer with a good career behind him when he took command of the Flying Squadron, but his handling of the squadron in the Caribbean led to much criticism of him postwar. An inquiry blamed him for "vacillation, dilatoriness, and lack of enterprise" during his time off Cienfuegos and Santiago de Cuba, and his performance compared unfavorably with that of Sampson. Moreover, it was more the poor condition of Cervera's ships than Schley's actions which allowed the U.S. Navy to trap Cervera's squadron at Santiago de Cuba. An ugly postwar public battle with Sampson over who deserved credit for leading the U.S. fleet in its crushing victory over Cervera's squadron in the Battle of Santiago de Cuba after the Flying Squadron's dissolution did nothing to help Schley's reputation, and he retired in 1901 in some disgrace.

== Bibliography ==
- Nofi, Albert A. (1996). The Spanish–American War, 1898. Conshohocken, Pennsylvania: Combined Books. ISBN 0-938289-57-8. OCLC 33970678.
