= List of ship commissionings in 1900 =

The list of ship commissionings in 1900 is a chronological list of ships commissioned in 1900. In cases where no official commissioning ceremony was held, the date of service entry may be used instead.

Date	Operator	Ship	Flag	Class and type	Pennant	Other notes
13 February	Imperial German Navy	SMS Kaiser Wilhelm II		Kaiser Friedrich III-class battleship		
20 February	United States Navy	USS Kearsarge		Kearsarge-class battleship	BB-5	
20 February	Royal Navy	HMS Ocean		Canopus-class battleship		
27 March	Royal Navy	HMS Goliath		Canopus-class battleship		
1 April	Imperial German Navy	SMS Fürst Bismarck		Armoured cruiser		
15 May	United States Navy	USS Kentucky		Kearsarge-class battleship	BB-6	
29 May	United States Navy	USS Albany		New Orleans-class protected cruiser	CL-23	
25 June	Imperial German Navy	SMS Niobe		Gazelle-class cruiser		
1 September	French Navy	Saint Louis		Charlemagne-class battleship		
20 September	Imperial German Navy	SMS Nymphe		Gazelle-class cruiser		
16 October	United States Navy	USS Alabama		Illinois-class battleship	BB-8	
26 October	Regia Marina	Fulmine		Destroyer	–	
1 November	Royal Navy	HMS Glory		Canopus-class battleship		

== Bibliography ==
- Roberts, John (1979). "Great Britain (including Empire Forces)". In Chesneau, Roger & Kolesnik, Eugene M. (eds.). Conway's All the World's Fighting Ships 1860–1905. New York: Mayflower Books. pp. 1–113. ISBN 0-8317-0302-4.
