= USS Wisconsin (BB-9) =

Pre-dreadnought battleship of the United States Navy

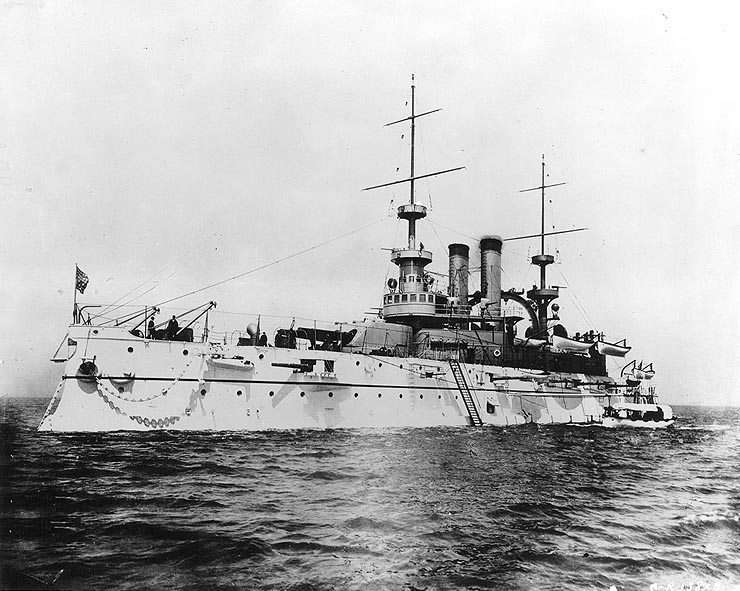
- USS Wisconsin at anchor

History

United States
- Name: Wisconsin
- Namesake: Wisconsin
- Builder: Union Iron Works
- Laid down: 9 February 1897
- Launched: 26 November 1898
- Commissioned: 4 February 1901
- Decommissioned: 15 May 1920
- Stricken: 1 July 1921
- Fate: Sold for scrap

General characteristics
- Class & type: Illinois-class battleship
- Displacement: Normal: 11,565 long tons (11,751 t); Full load: 12,250 long tons (12,450 t)
- Length: 373 ft 10 in (113.94 m) loa
- Beam: 72 ft 3 in (22.02 m)
- Draft: 23 ft 8 in (7.21 m)
- Installed power: 8 × fire-tube boilers; 10,000 ihp (7,500 kW)
- Propulsion: 2 × triple-expansion steam engines; 2 × screw propellers
- Speed: 16 knots (30 km/h; 18 mph)
- Crew: 531
- Armament: 4 × 13 in (330 mm)/35 caliber guns; 14 × 6 in (152 mm)/40 caliber guns; 16 × 6-pounder guns (57 mm (2.2 in)); 6 × 1-pounder guns (37 mm (1.5 in)); 4 × 18 in (457 mm) torpedo tubes
- Armor: Belt: 4 to 16.5 in (102 to 419 mm); Turrets: 14 in (356 mm); Barbettes: 15 in (381 mm); Casemates: 6 in (152 mm); Conning tower: 10 in (254 mm)

USS Wisconsin (hull number: BB-9), an Illinois-class pre-dreadnought battleship, was the first ship of the United States Navy to be named for the 30th state. She was the third and final member of her class to be built. Her keel was laid down in February 1897 at the Union Iron Works in San Francisco, and she was launched in November 1898. The completed ship was commissioned into the fleet in February 1901. The ship was armed with a main battery of four 13-inch (330 mm) guns and she had a top speed of 16 knots (30 km/h; 18 mph).

Wisconsin served as the flagship of the Pacific Fleet from her commissioning to 1903; during this period, she made one long distance cruise to American Samoa in late 1901. In 1903, she was transferred to the Asiatic Fleet, where she served as the Northern Squadron flagship. She returned to the United States in late 1906, where she was overhauled extensively. In July 1908, she joined the Great White Fleet for the second leg of its cruise around the world, which lasted until February 1909. The ship remained in service with the Atlantic Fleet until early 1910, when she was reduced to reserve status.

The vessel was employed as a training ship starting in 1912, primarily for cadets from the US Naval Academy. After the United States entered World War I in April 1917, Wisconsin's training duties expanded to engine room personnel. She was also assigned to the Coast Battleship Patrol Squadron. She took part in a naval review in December 1918 after the war ended. She served briefly with the fleet in 1919, though by May 1920, she was decommissioned. The old battleship, thoroughly obsolete by this time, was sold for scrap in January 1922 and broken up.

== Description ==
Design work on the Illinois class of pre-dreadnought battleships began in 1896, at which time the United States Navy had few modern battleships in service. Initial debate over whether to build a new low-freeboard design like the Indiana-class battleships in service or a higher-freeboard vessel like Iowa (then under construction) led to a decision to adopt the latter type. The mixed secondary armament of 6 and 8 in (152 and 203 mm) guns of previous classes was standardized to just 6-inch weapons to save weight and simplify ammunition supplies. Another major change was the introduction of modern, balanced turrets with sloped faces instead of the older "Monitor"-style turrets of earlier American battleships.

Plan and profile drawing of the Illinois class

Wisconsin was 373 feet 10 inches (113.94 m) long overall and had a beam of 72 ft 3 in (22.02 m) and a draft of 23 ft 8 in (7.21 m). She displaced 11,653 long tons (11,840 t) as designed and up to 12,250 long tons (12,450 t) at full load. The ship was powered by two-shaft triple-expansion steam engines rated at 10,000 indicated horsepower (7,500 kW), driving two screw propellers. Steam was provided by eight coal-fired fire-tube boilers, which were ducted into a pair of funnels placed side by side. The propulsion system generated a top speed of 16 knots (30 km/h; 18 mph). As built, she was fitted with heavy military masts, but these were replaced by cage masts in 1909. She had a crew of 531 officers and enlisted men, which increased to 690–713.

The ship was armed with a main battery of four 13 in (330 mm)/35 caliber guns (Note: /35 refers to the length of the gun in terms of calibers. A /35 gun is 35 times long as it is in bore diameter.) in two twin gun turrets on the centerline, one forward and aft. The secondary battery consisted of fourteen 6 in (152 mm)/40 caliber Mark IV guns, which were placed in casemates in the hull. For close-range defense against torpedo boats, she carried sixteen 6-pounder guns mounted in casemates along the side of the hull and six 1-pounder guns. As was standard for capital ships of the period, Wisconsin carried four 18 in (457 mm) torpedo tubes in deck mounted torpedo launchers.

Wisconsin's main armored belt was 16.5 in (419 mm) thick over the magazines and the propulsion machinery spaces and 4 in (102 mm) elsewhere. The main battery gun turrets had 14-inch (356 mm) thick faces, and the supporting barbettes had 15 in (381 mm) of armor plating on their exposed sides. Armor that was 6 in thick protected the secondary battery. The conning tower had 10 in (254 mm) thick sides.

== Service history ==
=== Pacific and Asiatic Fleets ===
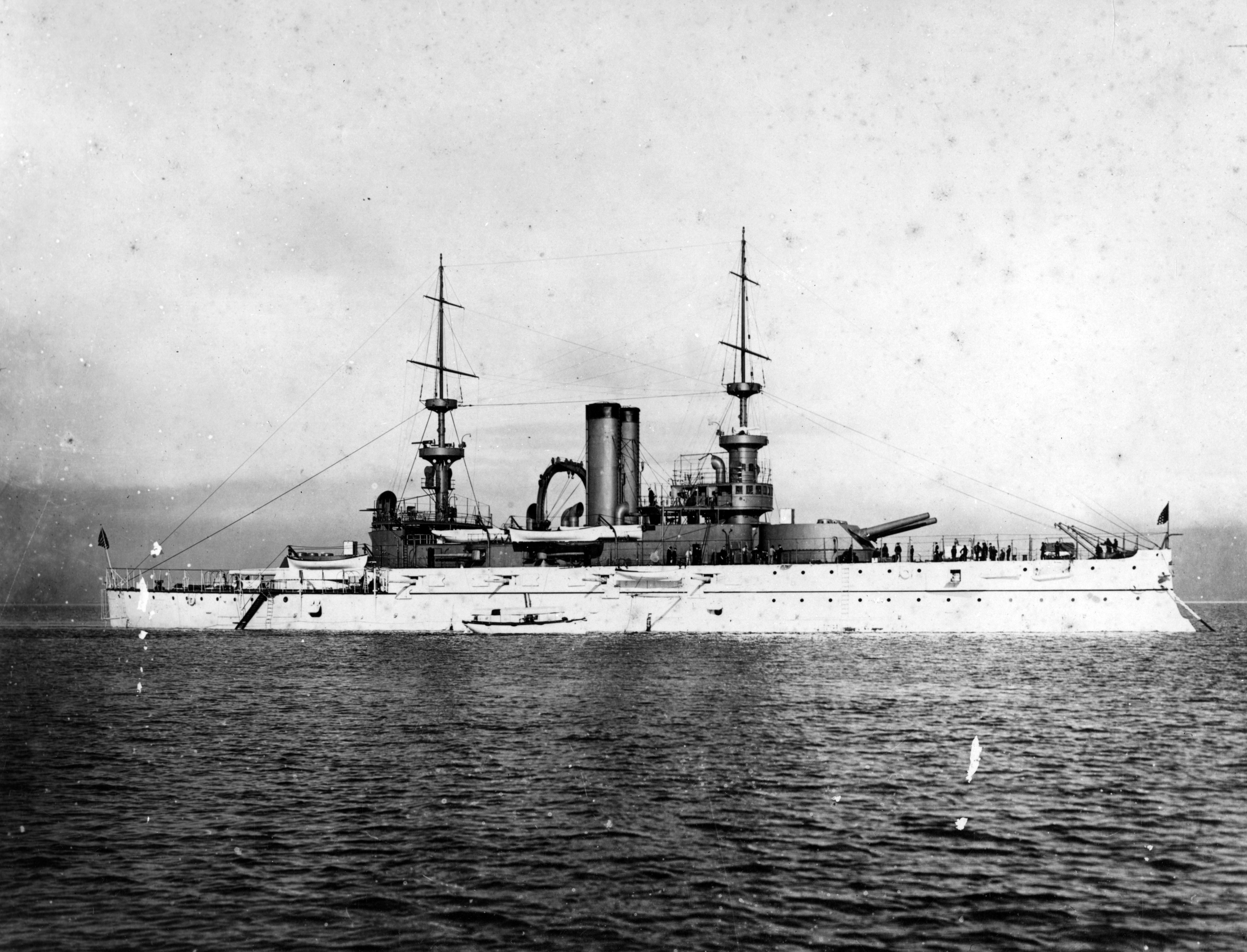
Wisconsin off San Francisco in 1901

The keel for Wisconsin was laid down on 9 February 1897 at the Union Iron Works in San Francisco. She was launched on 26 November 1898 and was commissioned into the fleet on 4 February 1901. The ship steamed out of San Francisco on 12 March for initial training in Magdalena Bay, Mexico from 17 March to 11 April. She was back in San Francisco on 15 April for repairs, which lasted until 28 May. She then left for Port Orchard, Washington, arriving on 1 June. Wisconsin stayed there for nine days before returning to San Francisco. Later that month, she joined the battleships Oregon and Iowa, the protected cruiser Philadelphia, and the torpedo boat Farragut for a tour of the west coast of the United States. They arrived in Port Angeles, Washington on 29 June and proceeded to Port Whatcom, Washington on 2 July, where they took part in Independence Day celebrations. The following day, they returned to Port Angeles and took part in training exercises, which lasted to mid-July.

Wisconsin entered the drydock at the Puget Sound Navy Yard in Bremerton, Washington on 23 July for repairs that lasted until 14 October. She then sailed to Honolulu, Hawaii, arriving on 23 October. There, she took on coal and continued on to American Samoa, conducting gunnery training while en route. She arrived in Tutuila on 5 November, and stayed with the collier Abarenda and the hospital ship Solace for about two weeks before steaming to Apia in German Samoa. Wisconsin left the island on 21 November for Hawaii, from which she continued on to Central America. She arrived in Acapulco, Mexico on 25 December and remained there for three days to coal. She made visits to Callao, Peru and Valparaíso, Chile before returning to Acapulco on 26 February 1902. The ship then conducted a wide variety training exercises in Magdalena Bay and Pichilinque Bay from 5 to 22 March, before steaming up the west coast of the United States, stopping in Coronado, San Francisco, and Port Angeles. She arrived in the Puget Sound Navy Yard on 4 June for repairs that lasted until 11 August.

The ship took part in gunnery training off Tacoma and Seattle before additional maintenance at Puget Sound on 29 August. Wisconsin departed Washington on 12 September bound for Panama—then still part of Colombia—to protect American interests in the country. She was by this time serving as the flagship of the Pacific Squadron, under Rear Admiral Silas Casey III. The Thousand Days' War was being waged in Panama, and so Casey brought representatives from the two sides aboard Wisconsin for negotiations that ultimately ended the conflict. The ship left Panama on 22 November and steamed back to San Francisco, arriving on 5 December. On the 9th, Casey transferred his flag to the armored cruiser New York. Wisconsin then conducted gunnery training until 17 December, followed by another period in drydock at Puget Sound from 20 December to 13 May 1903. She was then assigned to the Asiatic Fleet; she coaled in Honolulu before arriving in Yokohama, Japan on 12 June. Rear Admiral Philip H. Cooper, the commander of the Northern Squadron, Asiatic Fleet hoisted his flag aboard Wisconsin on 15 June.

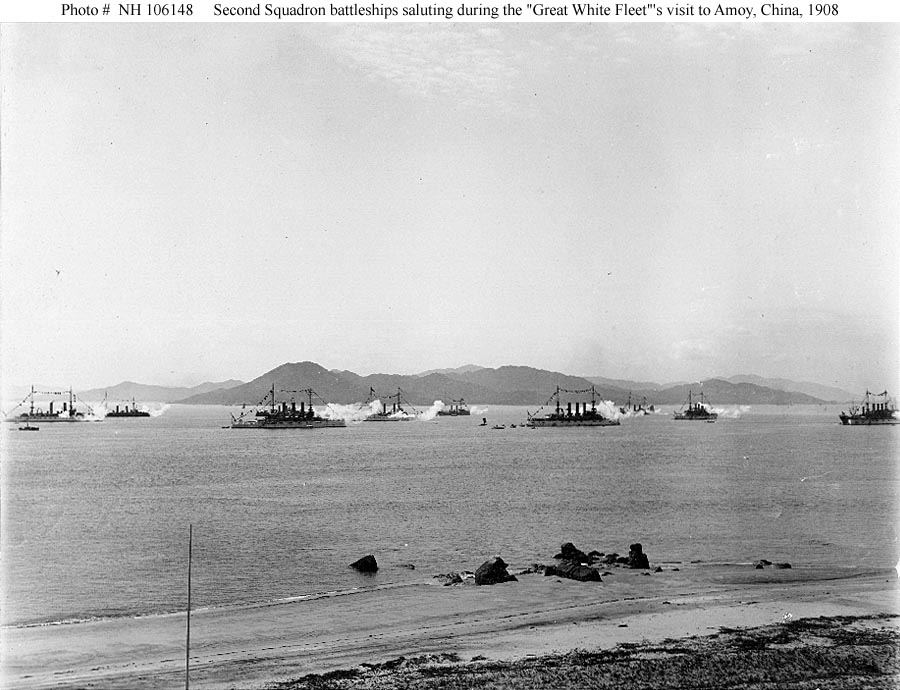
The Great White Fleet in Amoy; Wisconsin is the second ship from the right

Wisconsin spent the next three years in the Asiatic Fleet; during this time, her routine consisted of operations off north China and Japan in the summer and in the Philippines in the winter. She visited numerous East Asian ports, including Kobe, Yokohama, Nagasaki in Japan and Amoy, Shanghai, Yantai, Nanjing, and Taku in China. The ship left the Asiatic Fleet on 20 September 1906 when she departed Yokohama, bound for Honolulu. After coaling there from 3 to 8 October, she proceeded to San Francisco, arriving on 18 October. Wisconsin spent a week there before steaming north to Puget Sound, where she was decommissioned on 16 November for a lengthy overhaul that lasted until the end of April 1908. She then steamed south to San Francisco, where she arrived on 6 May to take part in a naval review there. She was back in Puget Sound on 21 May to have new fire control equipment installed; the work lasted until 22 June.

=== Great White Fleet and the Atlantic Fleet ===
The ship then steamed back down to San Francisco in early July. There, she joined the Great White Fleet, which had departed Hampton Roads, Virginia, the previous year on the first leg of its global cruise. The cruise of the Great White Fleet was conceived as a way to demonstrate American military power, particularly to Japan. Tensions had begun to rise between the United States and Japan after the latter's victory in the Russo-Japanese War in 1905, particularly over racist opposition to Japanese immigration to the United States. The press in both countries began to call for war, and Roosevelt hoped to use the demonstration of naval might to deter Japanese aggression.

The Great White Fleet then began its crossing of the Pacific, with a visit to Hawaii on the way. Stops in the South Pacific included Melbourne, Sydney, and Auckland. After leaving Australia, the fleet turned north for the Philippines, stopping in Manila, before continuing on to Japan where a welcoming ceremony was held in Yokohama. Three weeks of exercises followed in Subic Bay in the Philippines in November. The ships passed Singapore on 6 December and entered the Indian Ocean; they coaled in Colombo before proceeding to the Suez Canal and coaling again at Port Said, Egypt. The fleet called in several Mediterranean ports before stopping in Gibraltar, where an international fleet of British, Russian, French, and Dutch warships greeted the Americans. The ships then crossed the Atlantic to return to Hampton Roads on 22 February 1909. There, they conducted a naval review for President Theodore Roosevelt.

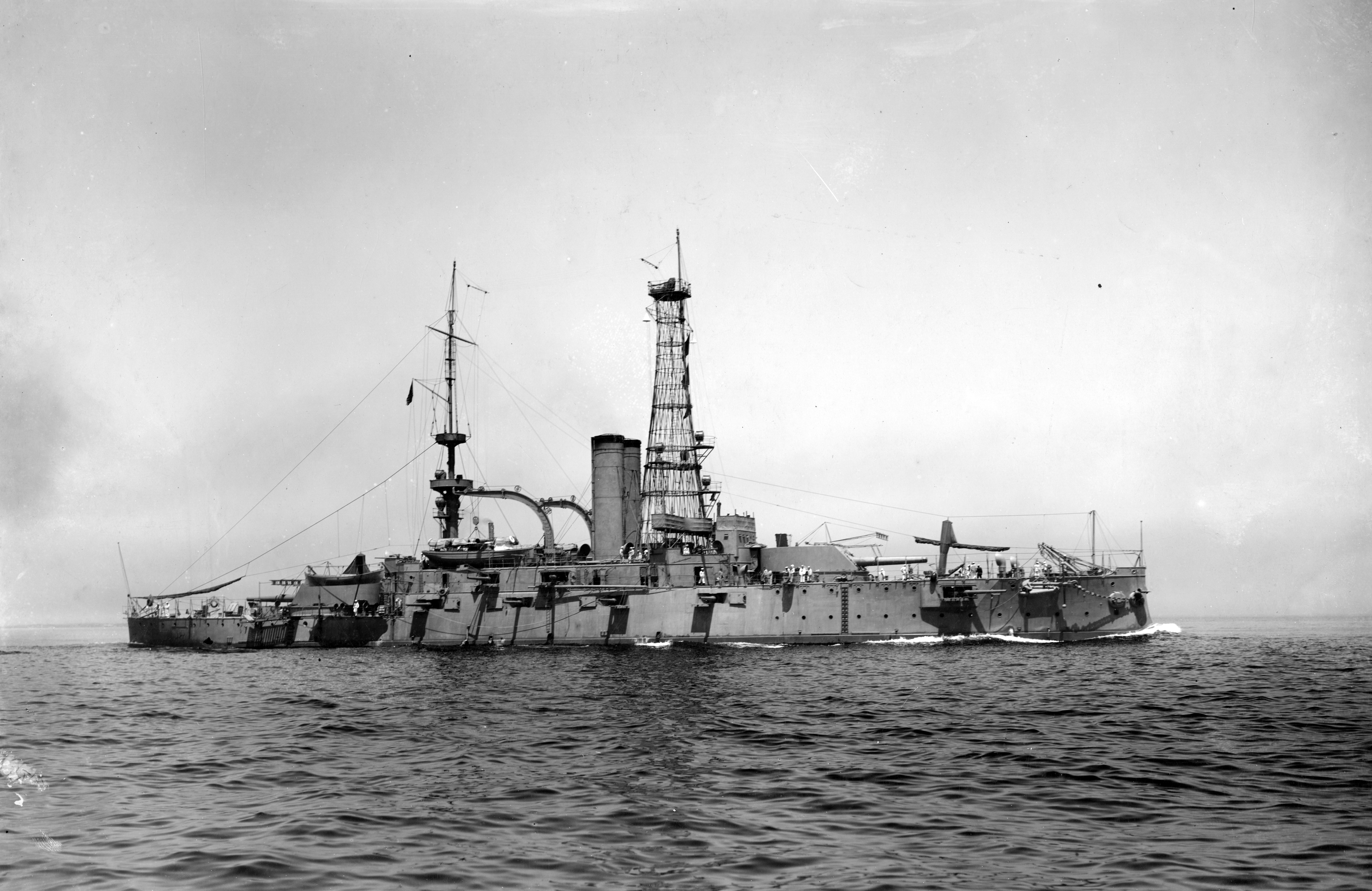
Wisconsin c. 1909–1910 after her modernization

Wisconsin steamed out of Hampton Roads on 6 March for Portsmouth, New Hampshire, arriving on the 9th. There, she entered the drydock for repairs and modifications, including a new gray paint scheme. After returning to service in June, she was assigned to the Atlantic Fleet, and she joined her unit in Hampton Roads at the end of the month. She immediate steamed back north for Portland, Maine, where she participated in Independence Day celebrations on 4 July. Wisconsin rejoined the fleet in Hampton Roads on 6 August for gunnery training off the Virginia Capes. Routine maintenance was performed at Hampton Roads during this period. In late September, she steamed to New York for the Hudson–Fulton Celebration. The celebration saw an international fleet of warships from Germany, Britain, France, Italy, and other countries join the Atlantic Fleet to commemorate Henry Hudson's discovery of the Hudson River. Wisconsin left the ceremonies on 5 October for repairs at Portsmouth, which lasted from 7 October to 28 November. She then returned to Hampton Roads, by way of Newport, Rhode Island, where she embarked sailors assigned to the Atlantic Fleet.

The ship conducted exercises with the rest of the fleet off the Virginia Capes until the middle of December, when she departed for New York, where she would spend Christmas and New Year's Day. In early January 1910, she steamed south to Cuban waters for exercises. During this period, which lasted from 12 January to 19 March, she was based in Guantánamo Bay, Cuba. After the conclusion of the exercises, Wisconsin made visits to Tompkinsville, New York, and New Orleans, Louisiana. On 22 April, she arrived back in New York, where she unloaded her stocks of ammunition, before proceeding to the Portsmouth Navy Yard. There, she was placed in the Atlantic Reserve Fleet. She was transferred to Philadelphia in April 1912 and later that year she participated in a naval review, which was held off Yonkers, New York. The ship then returned to the Atlantic Reserve Fleet; she was placed in ordinary on 31 October 1913. In early 1915, Wisconsin was assigned to the United States Naval Academy Practice Squadron, along with the battleships Missouri and Ohio. The three ships made a cruise to the Pacific coast via the recently completed Panama Canal; Wisconsin was the third battleship to transit the canal since its opening.

=== World War I ===
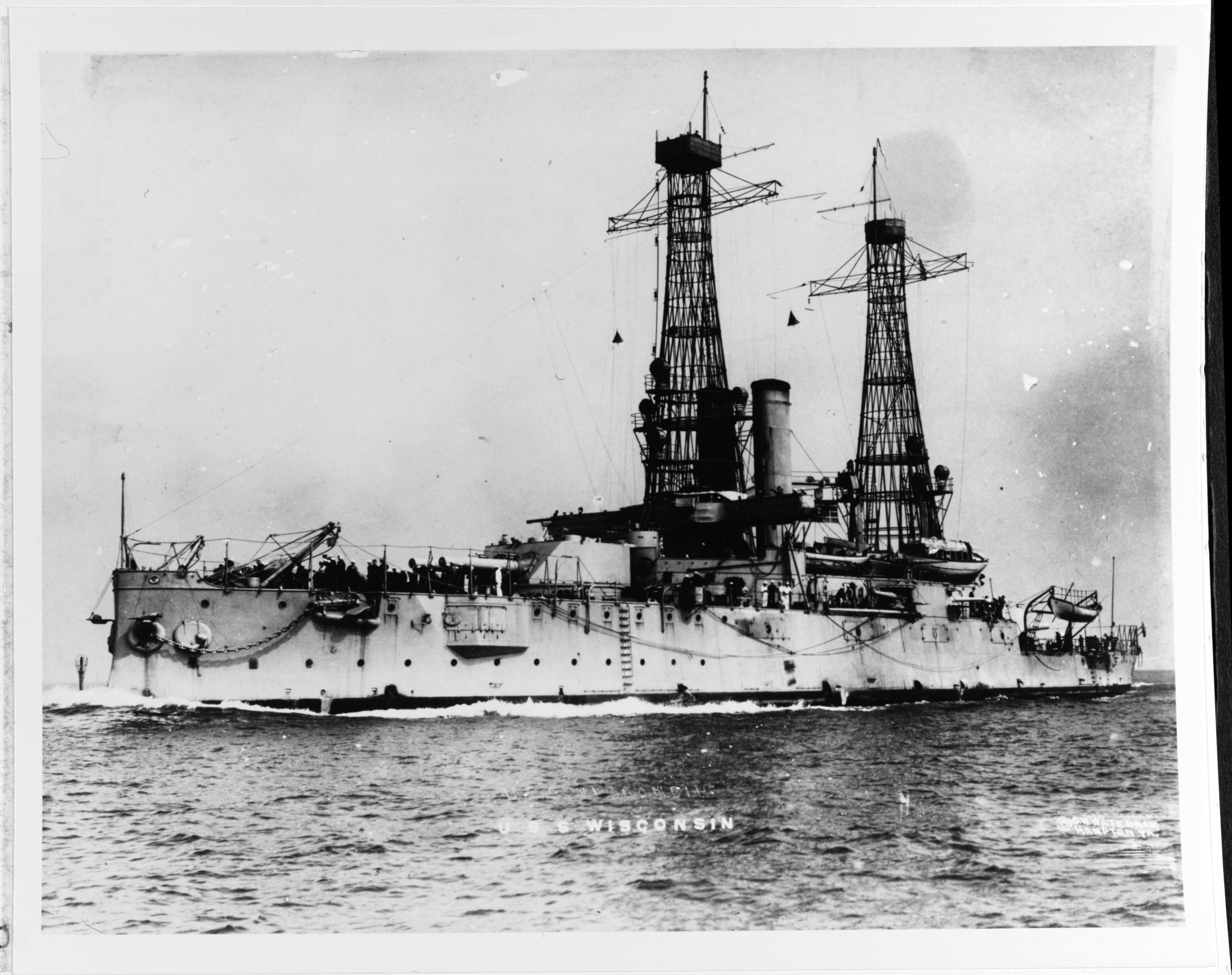
Wisconsin c. 1918; note the secondary guns have been removed and plated over

Wisconsin continued in her service as a training ship into 1917; she was in the Philadelphia Navy Yard on 6 April when the United States declared war on Germany, entering World War I. On the 8th, the ship began to receive men from the Naval Militia to flesh out her crew. She was placed in full commission on 23 April and was assigned to the Coast Battleship Patrol Squadron, along with Missouri and Ohio, commanded by Commander David F. Sellers. On 6 May, Wisconsin steamed to the Virginia Capes, arriving in Yorktown, Virginia the next day. From then to early August, the ship was employed as a training ship for engine room personnel in the Chesapeake Bay area. She then took part in squadron exercises from 13 to 19 August; these included the battleships Kearsarge, Alabama, Illinois, Kentucky, Ohio, Missouri, and Maine. Wisconsin then proceeded to Port Jefferson, New York for additional exercises.

The ship then steamed to the York River in the western Chesapeake in early October, followed by a short period in drydock at the Philadelphia Navy Yard from 30 October to 18 December. She returned to the Chesapeake, where she remained into early 1918. More repairs at Philadelphia followed from 13 May to 3 June, after which she steamed to Annapolis. While en route, she received orders to cruise close to shore, as the German submarine U-151 had been operating in the area since 23 May, and had sunk several ships. Wisconsin reached Annapolis on 7 June, having stopped in the Delaware River to wait for U-151 to depart. A contingent of 175 midshipmen came aboard Wisconsin on 8 June for a training cruise to the Chesapeake. On 29 August she returned to Annapolis and disembarked the midshipmen before returning to Yorktown the next day. There, she took on 217 men for another round of training. On 11 November, Germany signed the Armistice that ended the fighting in Europe. Wisconsin continued in her training ship duties until 20 December, when she was sent to New York for a naval review for Secretary of the Navy Josephus Daniels and Assistant Secretary of the Navy Franklin D. Roosevelt on 26 December.

Following the German surrender in November 1918, most of the battleships of the Atlantic Fleet were used as transports to ferry American soldiers back from France. Wisconsin and her sisters were not so employed, however, owing to their short range and small size, which would not permit sufficient additional accommodations. Wisconsin instead steamed to Cuba for training with the Atlantic Fleet into 1919. She went on a midshipmen training cruise to the Caribbean in mid-1919. On 15 May 1920, Wisconsin was decommissioned; she was reclassified as BB-9 on 17 July. She was eventually sold on 26 January 1922 and broken up for scrap.
