= 13-inch/35-caliber gun =

13"/35 caliber Mark 1 and Mark 2
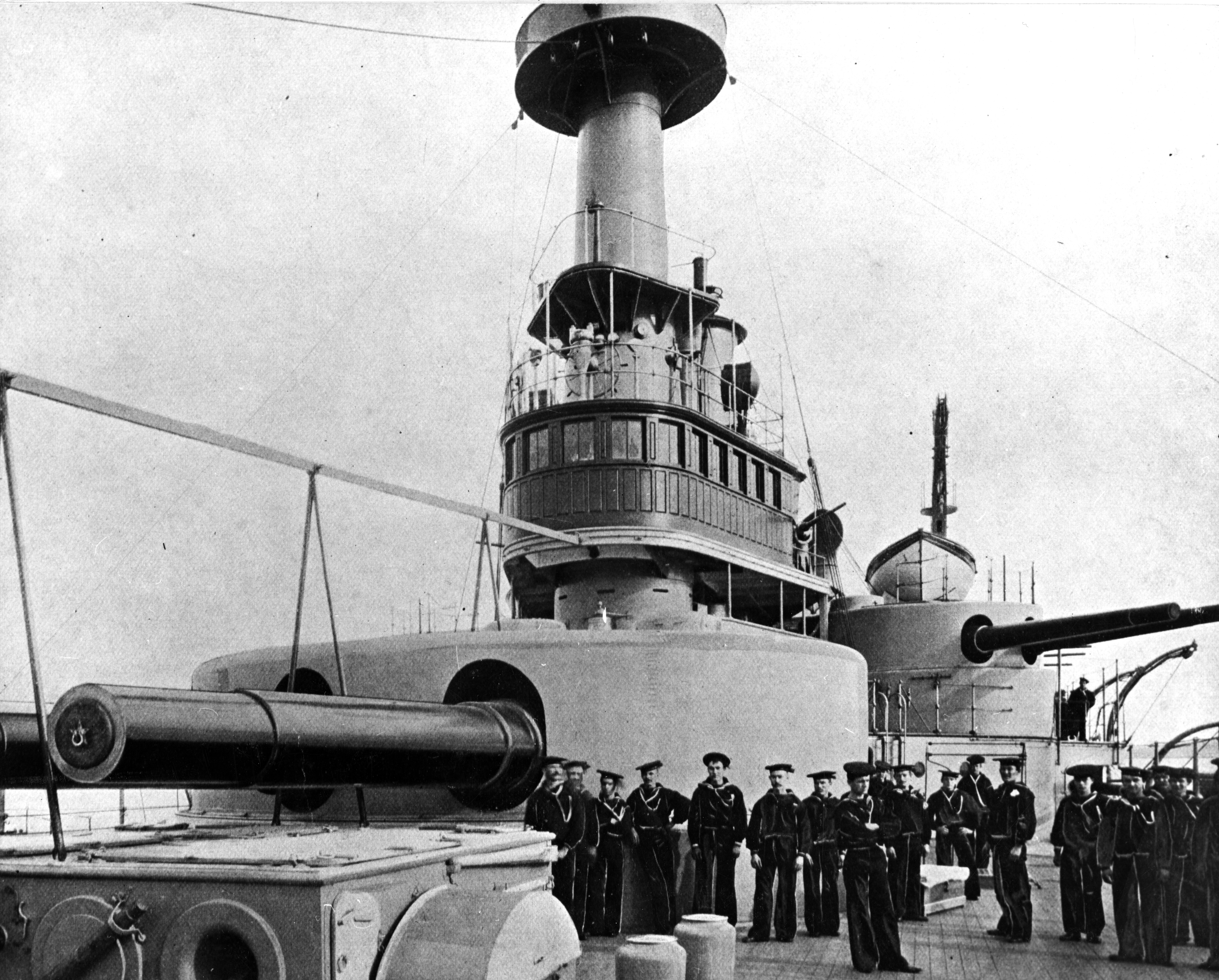
- Forward 13-inch gun turret of USS Indiana (BB-1), c. 1898.
- Type: Naval gun
- Place of origin: United States

Service history
- In service: 1895
- Used by: United States Navy
- Wars: Spanish–American War; Philippine–American War; Boxer Rebellion; World War I; Siberian Intervention

Production history
- Designer: Bureau of Ordnance
- Manufacturer: US Naval Gun Factory
- Unit cost: $53,000
- No. built: Mark 1: 12 (Nos. 1–12); Mark 2: 22 (Nos. 13–34)
- Variants: Mark 1 and Mark 2

Specifications
- Mass: 136,000 lb (62,000 kg) (without breech); 137,900 lb (62,600 kg) (with breech)
- Barrel length: 455 in (11,600 mm) bore (35 calibers)
- Shell: 1,130 lb (510 kg) armor-piercing
- Caliber: 13 in (330 mm)
- Elevation: -5° to +15°
- Traverse: −150° to +150°
- Rate of fire: 1 round per minute
- Muzzle velocity: 2,000 ft/s (610 m/s)
- Effective firing range: 12,000 yd (10,973 m) at 15° elevation

The 13"/35 caliber gun Mark 1 (spoken "thirteen-inch-thirty-five-caliber") was used for the primary batteries on eight of the first nine battleships in the United States Navy, Indiana-class, Kearsarge-class and Illinois-class; USS Iowa (BB-4) used the 12-inch (305 mm)/35 caliber gun.

The Navy's Policy Board called for a variety of large caliber weapons in 1890, with ranges all the way up to 16-inch (406 mm). A 16-inch caliber gun was beyond US manufacturing capabilities at this time though and the largest gun possible was the 13-inch (330 mm)/35 caliber. The Navy intended to use this gun in short-range action against heavily armored targets and was fitted to the first true battleship in the US Navy, Indiana. This turned out to be the only 13-inch gun developed for the US Navy.

== Design ==
The 13-inch Mark 1, gun Nos. 1–12, was a built-up gun constructed in a length of 35 caliber, Mod 0 and Mod 1. The Mod 0 had a tube, jacket, and nine hoops while the Mod 1 had a nickel-steel liner and only eight hoops. The Mark 2, gun Nos. 13–34, was of similar construction as the Mark 1 Mod 0 but had only seven hoops and two locking ring. Two Mark 2 guns, Nos. 23 and 33, were converted into experimental guns. The first, No. 23, was converted in 1923, into a 16-inch/28.8 caliber Mark A Mod 0 experimental gun. The barrel was bored out to 16-inch and hooped to the muzzle. The gun was tested a total of seven times in July 1923, but then set aside until 1956. The gun was used for bomb tests between October and December 1956, and fired another 19 times. This gun is now on display at the Naval Surface Warfare Center in Dahlgren, Virginia. The other Mark 2, No. 33, was also bored out, but only to 14-inch (356 mm), sometime prior to 1923, and again used as an experimental gun, this one is at Plate Battery. In 2005, it too was still located at the NSWC, Dahlgren.

== Incidents ==
Gun No. 2, mounted on Indiana, suffered from erosion at the front slope of the chamber and was replaced with another gun. It was first reported in September 1897, after only 32 rounds had been fired. In May 1902, No. 2 was sent back to the US Naval Gun Factory to be relined. After having had 71 rounds fired through it, and finding that guns built at the same time and fired the same number of rounds showed no sign of erosion, it was determined that the erosion was due to a defect in the manufacture of the forging.

Gun No. 13, mounted on Kearsarge, was injured in January 1901, when a shell exploded prematurely in the barrel. It was repaired with a lining tube inserted into the barrel and used at the Naval Proving Grounds.

Gun No. 18, mounted on Kentucky, suffered an injury while on Asiatic station, probably from a shell exploding in the bore. It was replaced with another gun.

Gun No. 34 was completely disabled by an accident to its tube; it was reassembled with new forgings.

== Naval service ==
| Ship | Gun Installed | Gun Mount |
|---|---|---|
| USS Indiana (BB-1) | Mark 1: 13"/35 caliber | Mark 2: 2 × twin turrets |
| USS Massachusetts (BB-2) | Mark 1: 13"/35 caliber | Mark 2: 2 × twin turrets |
| USS Oregon (BB-3) | Mark 1: 13"/35 caliber | Mark 2: 2 × twin turrets |
| USS Kearsarge (BB-5) | Mark 2: 13"/35 caliber | Mark 3: 2 × dual-caliber turrets |
| USS Kentucky (BB-6) | Mark 2: 13"/35 caliber | Mark 3: 2 × dual-caliber turrets |
| USS Illinois (BB-7) | Mark 2: 13"/35 caliber | Mark 4: 2 × twin turrets |
| USS Alabama (BB-8) | Mark 2: 13"/35 caliber | Mark 4: 2 × twin turrets |
| USS Wisconsin (BB-9) | Mark 2: 13"/35 caliber | Mark 4: 2 × twin turrets |
