= USS Illinois (BB-7) =

Pre-dreadnought battleship of the United States Navy

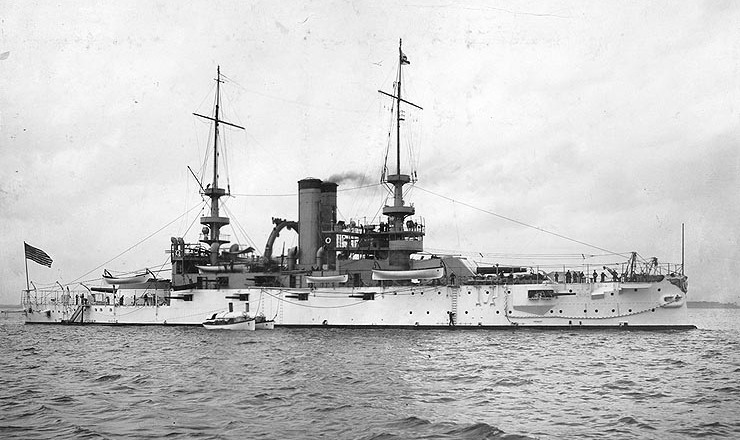
- Illinois at anchor

History

United States
- Name: Illinois
- Namesake: Illinois
- Builder: Newport News Shipbuilding & Dry Dock Co., Newport News
- Laid down: 10 February 1897
- Launched: 4 October 1898
- Commissioned: 16 September 1901
- Decommissioned: 15 May 1920
- Renamed: Prairie State, 8 January 1941
- Stricken: 26 March 1956
- Fate: Sold for scrap on 18 May 1956

General characteristics
- Class & type: Illinois-class battleship
- Displacement: Normal: 11,565 long tons (11,751 t); Full load: 12,250 long tons (12,450 t)
- Length: 375 ft 4 in (114.40 m) loa
- Beam: 72 ft 3 in (22.02 m)
- Draft: 23 ft 6 in (7.16 m)
- Installed power: 8 × fire-tube boilers; 10,000 ihp (7,500 kW)
- Propulsion: 2 × triple-expansion steam engines; 2 × screw propellers
- Speed: 16 knots (30 km/h; 18 mph)
- Crew: 536
- Armament: 4 × 13 in (330 mm)/35 caliber guns; 14 × 6 in (152 mm)/40 caliber guns; 16 × 6-pounder guns (57 mm (2.2 in)); 6 × 1-pounder guns (37 mm (1.5 in)); 4 × 18 in (457 mm) torpedo tubes
- Armor: Belt: 4 to 16.5 in (102 to 419 mm); Turrets: 14 in (356 mm); Barbettes: 15 in (381 mm); Casemates: 6 in (152 mm); Conning tower: 10 in (254 mm)

USS Illinois (hull number: BB-7) was a pre-dreadnought battleship built for the United States Navy. She was the lead ship of the Illinois class, and was the second ship of the U.S. Navy to be named for the 21st state. Her keel was laid down in February 1897 at the Newport News Shipbuilding & Dry Dock Company, and she was launched in October 1898. She was commissioned in September 1901. The ship was armed with a main battery of four 13-inch (330 mm) guns and she had a top speed of 16 knots (30 km/h; 18 mph).

Illinois served with the European Squadron from 1902 to 1903, and with the North Atlantic Fleet until 1907, by which time it had been renamed the Atlantic Fleet. During this time, she accidentally collided with two other battleships. From December 1907 to February 1909, she circumnavigated the globe with the Great White Fleet. From November 1912, the ship was used as a training ship. She was lent to the state of New York in 1919 for use as a training vessel for the New York Naval Militia. The ship was converted into a floating armory in 1924 as a result of the Washington Naval Treaty, and it was as a floating armory, barracks and school that she served for the next thirty years. In January 1941 she was reclassified as IX-15 and renamed Prairie State so that her former name could be given to USS Illinois (BB-65), a new Iowa-class battleship. Prairie State was ultimately sold for scrap in 1956.

== Description ==
Design work on the Illinois class of pre-dreadnought battleships began in 1896, at which time the United States Navy had few modern battleships in service. Initial debate over whether to build a new low-freeboard design like the Indiana-class battleships in service or a higher-freeboard vessel like Iowa (then under construction) led to a decision to adopt the latter type. The mixed secondary armament of 6 and 8 in (152 and 203 mm) guns of previous classes was standardized to just 6-inch weapons to save weight and simplify ammunition supplies. Another major change was the introduction of modern, balanced turrets with sloped faces instead of the older "Monitor"-style turrets of earlier American battleships.

Plan and profile drawing of the Illinois class

Illinois was 374 feet (114 m) long overall and had a beam of 72 ft 3 in (22.02 m) and a draft of 23 ft 6 in (7.16 m). She displaced 11,565 long tons (11,751 t) as designed and up to 12,250 long tons (12,450 t) at full load. The ship was powered by two-shaft triple-expansion steam engines rated at 10,000 indicated horsepower (7,500 kW), driving two screw propellers. Steam was provided by eight coal-fired fire-tube boilers, which were ducted into a pair of funnels placed side by side. The propulsion system generated a top speed of 16 knots (30 km/h; 18 mph). As built, she was fitted with heavy military masts, but these were replaced by cage masts in 1909. She had a crew of 536 officers and enlisted men, which increased to 690–713.

She was armed with a main battery of four 13-inch (330 mm)/35 caliber guns (Note: /35 refers to the length of the gun in terms of calibers. A /35 gun is 35 times long as it is in bore diameter.) in two twin-gun turrets on the centerline, one forward and aft. The secondary battery consisted of fourteen 6 in (152 mm)/40 caliber Mark IV guns, which were placed in individual casemates in the hull. For close-range defense against torpedo boats, she carried sixteen 6-pounder guns, also mounted individually in casemates along the side of the hull, and six 1-pounder guns. As was standard for capital ships of the period, Illinois carried four 18 in (457 mm) torpedo tubes in deck mounted launchers.

Illinois's main armored belt was 16.5 in (419 mm) thick over the magazines and the propulsion machinery spaces and 4 in (102 mm) elsewhere. The main battery gun turrets had 14-inch (356 mm) thick faces, and the supporting barbettes had 15 in (381 mm) of armor plating on their exposed sides. Armor that was 6 in thick protected the secondary battery. The conning tower had 10 in (254 mm) thick sides.

== Service history ==
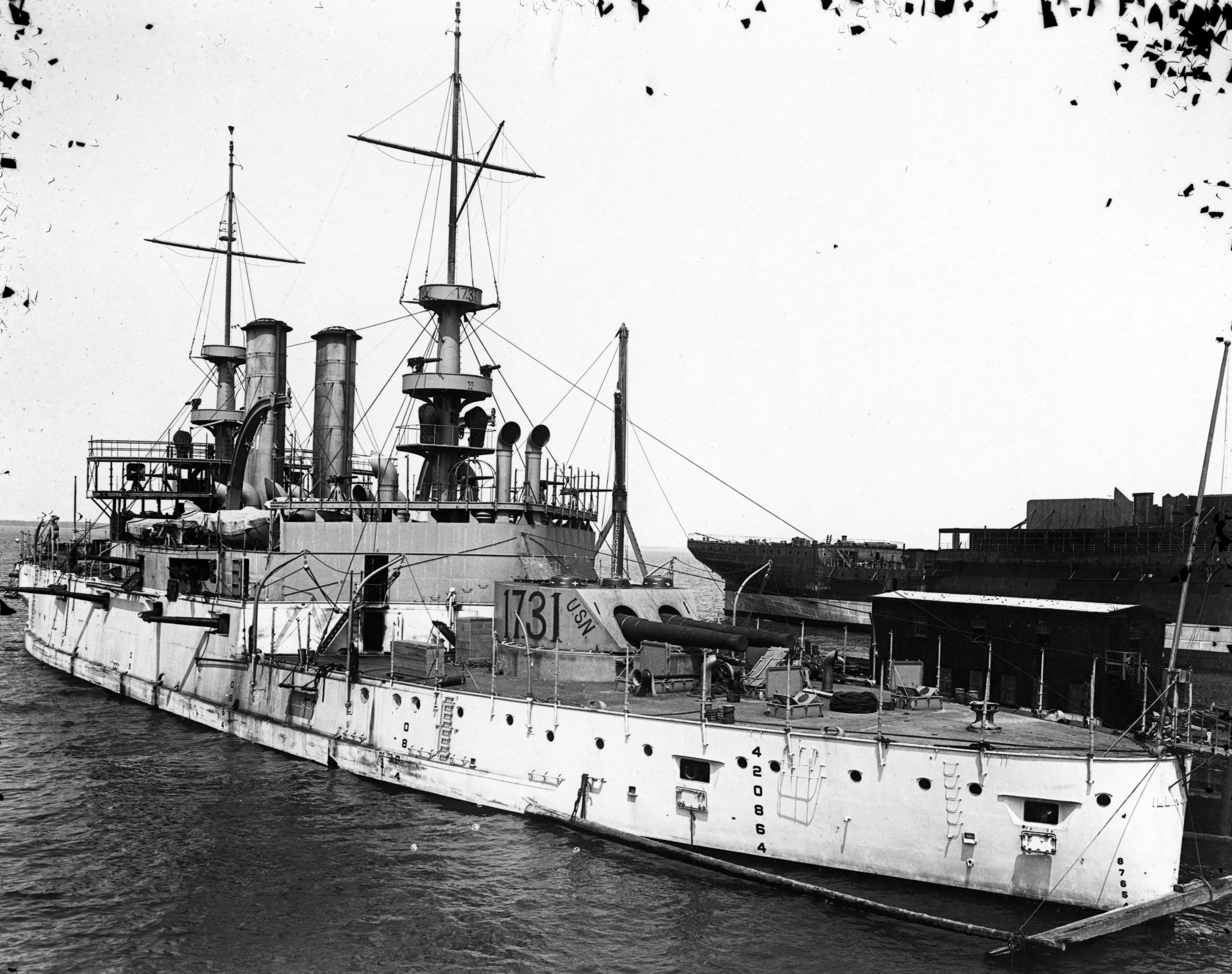
Illinois in 1901 after sea trial

=== Construction – 1906 ===
Illinois was laid down on 10 February 1897 by the Newport News Shipbuilding & Dry Dock Company of Newport News, Virginia. She was launched on 4 October 1898 and commissioned on 16 September 1901. The ship's first commander was Captain George A. Converse. Illinois was the first member of her class to be authorized, but the last to enter service. After commissioning, the ship began a shakedown cruise in the Chesapeake Bay, followed by initial training. She left the area on 20 November to test a new floating dry dock in Algiers, Louisiana. The ship was back in Newport News in January 1902. She served briefly as the flagship of Rear Admiral Robley D. Evans from 15 to 28 February; during this period, she took part in a reception for Prince Henry of Prussia, the brother of the German Kaiser.

On 30 April, now flying the flag of Rear Admiral A.S. Crowninshield, Illinois departed for a tour of Europe. She stopped in Naples, Italy on 18 May; here, Crowninshield took command of the European Squadron. Illinois took part in training exercises and ceremonial duties in European waters for the next two months, until 14 July, when she ran aground outside Oslo, Norway. She had to steam to Britain for repairs, which were carried out at Chatham. She left the port on 1 September for maneuvers with the rest of the fleet in the Mediterranean and South Atlantic.

On 10 January 1903, Illinois was reassigned to the North Atlantic Fleet, where she remained for the next four years. Her time was occupied with peacetime training exercises, gunnery practice, and various ceremonial activities. During this period, she was involved in two accidents with other battleships of the North Atlantic Fleet. The first took place on 30 March 1903, when she collided with Missouri. The second collision occurred on 31 July 1906, and took place with her sister ship Alabama. Also that year, Illinois was the first ship to win the Battenberg Cup.

=== Great White Fleet ===
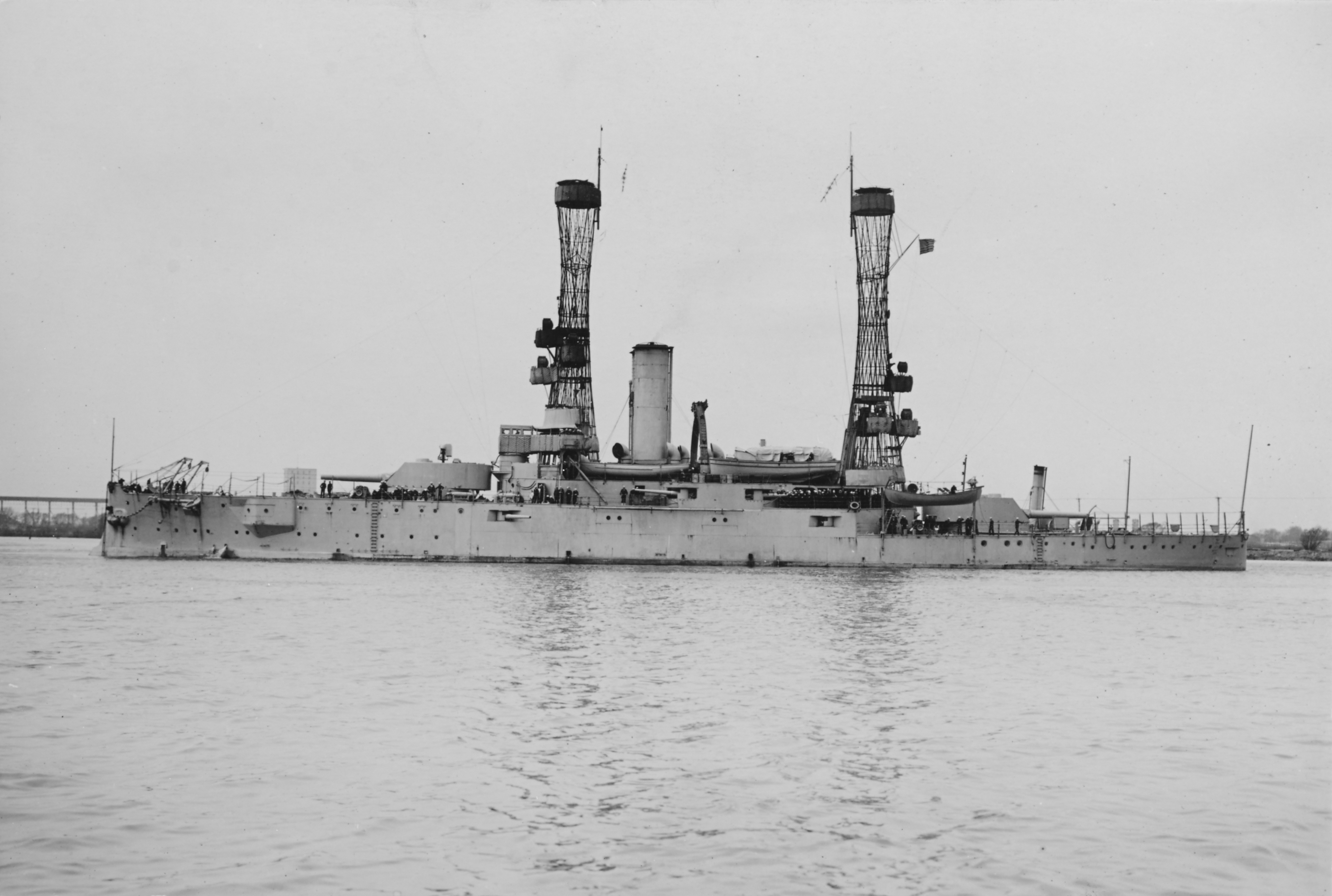
Illinois in 1919 in the Philadelphia Navy Yard

The ship's next significant action was the cruise of the Great White Fleet around the world, which started with a naval review for President Theodore Roosevelt in Hampton Roads. The cruise of the Great White Fleet was conceived as a way to demonstrate American military power, particularly to Japan. Tensions had begun to rise between the United States and Japan after the latter's victory in the Russo-Japanese War in 1905, particularly over racist opposition to Japanese immigration to the United States. The press in both countries began to call for war, and Roosevelt hoped to use the demonstration of naval might to deter Japanese aggression.

On 17 December, the fleet steamed out of Hampton Roads and cruised south to the Caribbean and then to South America, making stops in Port of Spain, Rio de Janeiro, Punta Arenas, and Valparaíso, among other cities. After arriving in Mexico in March 1908, the fleet spent three weeks conducting gunnery practice. The fleet then resumed its voyage up the Pacific coast of the Americas, stopping in San Francisco and Seattle before crossing the Pacific to Australia, stopping in Hawaii on the way. Stops in the South Pacific included Melbourne, Sydney, and Auckland.

After leaving Australia, the fleet turned north for the Philippines, stopping in Manila, before continuing on to Japan where a welcoming ceremony was held in Yokohama. Three weeks of exercises followed in Subic Bay in the Philippines in November. The ships passed Singapore on 6 December and entered the Indian Ocean; they coaled in Colombo before proceeding to the Suez Canal and coaling again at Port Said, Egypt. While there, the American fleet received word of an earthquake in Sicily. Illinois, the battleship Connecticut, and the supply ship Culgoa were sent to assist the relief effort. The fleet called in several Mediterranean ports before stopping in Gibraltar, where an international fleet of British, Russian, French, and Dutch warships greeted the Americans. The ships then crossed the Atlantic to return to Hampton Roads on 22 February 1909, having traveled 46,729 nautical miles (86,542 km; 53,775 mi). There, they conducted a naval review for Theodore Roosevelt.

=== Later career ===
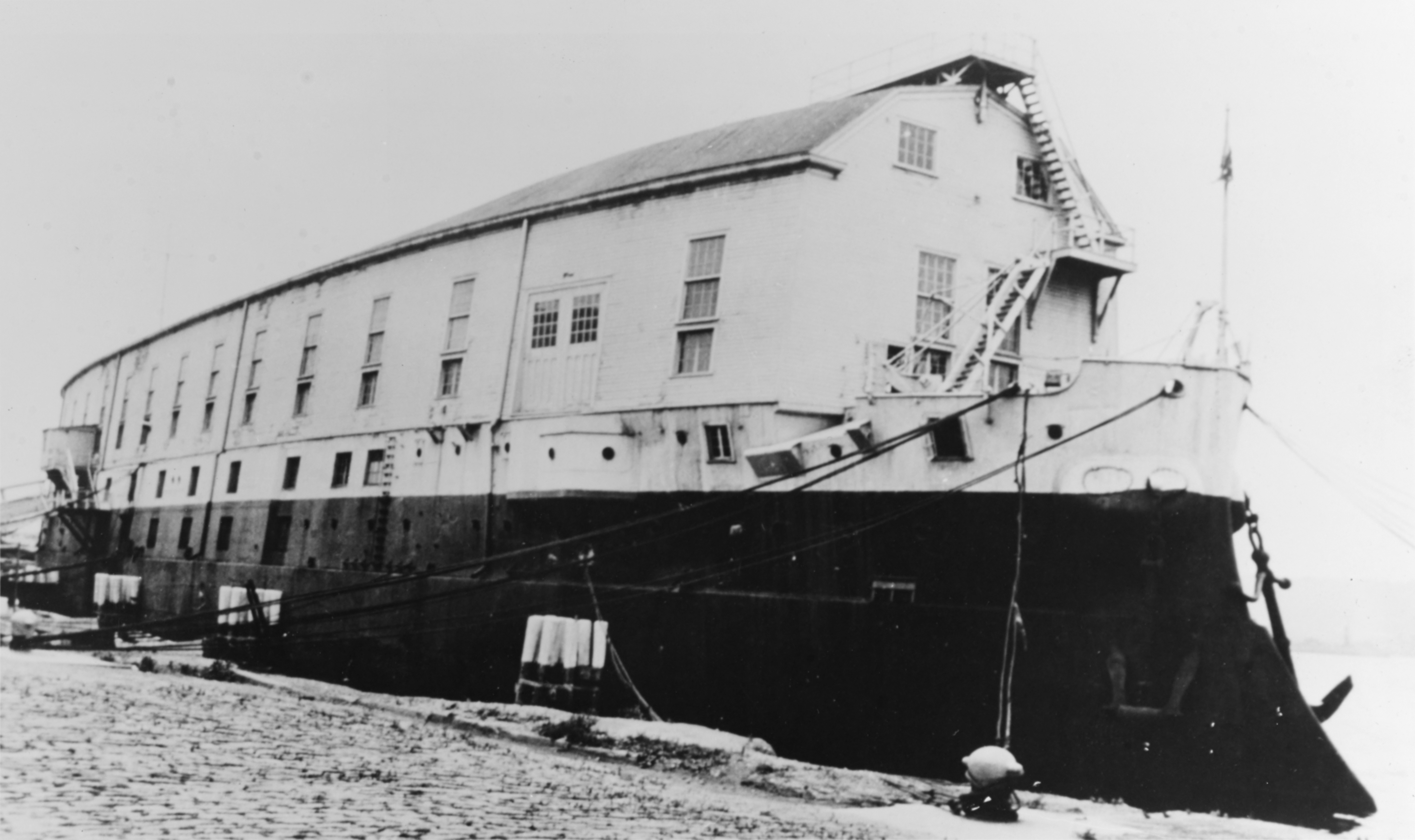
USNR Midshipmen's School Prairie State was conducted aboard the converted USS Illinois

On 4 August 1909, Illinois was decommissioned in Boston. The ship then underwent a major modernization, receiving new "cage" masts and more modern equipment. She spent the next three years in active service with the fleet, before being decommissioned once more on 16 April 1912. She returned to service on 2 November for major training maneuvers with the Atlantic Fleet. Illinois made training cruises to Europe with midshipmen from the US Naval Academy in mid-1913 and 1914. By 1919, she had been decommissioned at the Philadelphia Navy Yard. On 23 October 1921, she was loaned to the New York Naval Militia for training purposes. The 1922 Washington Naval Treaty, which mandated significant reductions in naval strength, stipulated that Illinois must be rendered incapable of warlike action. As a result, she was converted into a floating armory at the New York Navy Yard in 1924 and was assigned to the New York Naval Reserve.

On 8 January 1941, the ship was reclassified from BB-7 to IX-15, and was renamed Prairie State (Note: "Prairie State'" is the nickname of the state of Illinois.) so that her name could be used for the new battleship Illinois, which would be laid down a week later. Throughout World War II, she served with the U.S. Naval Reserve Midshipmen's School, based in New York. After the end of the war, Prairie State was kept as a barracks ship for a Naval Reserve unit. On 31 December 1955, the old ship was stricken and subsequently towed to Baltimore, where she was sold for scrap to Bethlehem Steel on 18 May 1956.
