= Illinois-class battleship =

Pre-dreadnought battleship class of the United States Navy

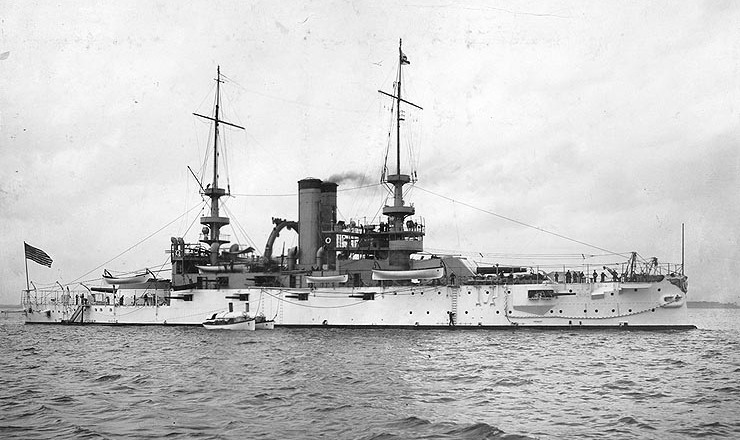
- USS Illinois, the lead ship of the class

Class overview
- Builders: Union Iron Works, CA; William Cramp and Sons, PA; Newport News Shipbuilding, VA
- Operators: United States Navy
- Preceded by: Kearsarge class
- Succeeded by: Maine class
- Built: 1896–1901
- In commission: 1900–1920
- Completed: 3
- Retired: 3

General characteristics
- Type: Pre-dreadnought battleship
- Displacement: Normal: 11,565 long tons (11,751 t); Full load: 12,250 long tons (12,450 t)
- Length: 375 ft 4 in (114.40 m) loa
- Beam: 72 ft 3 in (22.02 m)
- Draft: 23 ft 6 in (7.16 m)
- Installed power: 8 × fire-tube boilers; 10,000 ihp (7,500 kW)
- Propulsion: 2 × triple-expansion steam engines; 2 × screw propellers
- Speed: 16 knots (30 km/h; 18 mph)
- Crew: 536
- Armament: 4 × 13 in (330 mm)/35 caliber guns; 14 × 6 in (152 mm)/40 caliber guns; 16 × 6-pounder guns (57 mm (2.2 in)); 6 × 1-pounder guns (37 mm (1.5 in)); 4 × 18 in (457 mm) torpedo tubes
- Armor: Belt: 4 to 16.5 in (102 to 419 mm); Turrets: 14 in (356 mm); Barbettes: 15 in (381 mm); Casemates: 6 in (152 mm); Conning tower: 10 in (254 mm)

The Illinois class was a group of three pre-dreadnought battleships of the United States Navy commissioned at the beginning of the 20th century. The three ships, Illinois, Alabama, and Wisconsin, were built between 1896 and 1901. They were transitional ships; they incorporated advances over preceding designs, including the first modern gun turrets for the main battery, and new rapid-firing secondary guns, but they were also the last American battleships to feature dated technologies like fire-tube boilers and Harvey armor. They were armed with a main battery of four 13-inch (330 mm) guns in two twin turrets, supported by a secondary battery of fourteen 6 in (150 mm) guns. The ships had a designed speed of 16 knots (30 km/h; 18 mph), though they exceeded that speed by a significant margin.

The three ships served in a variety of roles and locations throughout their career. Illinois served with the North Atlantic Squadron and the European Squadron early in her career, while Wisconsin served as the flagship of the Pacific Fleet and then in the Asiatic Fleet. Illinois and Alabama started the cruise of the Great White Fleet in December 1907 from the east coast of the United States, though by the time they had rounded South America and stopped in California, Alabama was forced to leave the fleet due to machinery problems. Wisconsin joined the fleet there and continued on with it to the conclusion of its tour in February 1909. All three ships were modernized in 1909 and served in the Atlantic Fleet for a short time.

By 1912, all three ships had been reduced to the reserve fleet and were primarily employed as training ships. They continued in this role during World War I, training men to operate the machinery of warships and transports for the war effort. They were all decommissioned by 1920. Illinois was loaned to the New York Naval Militia and was converted into a floating arsenal. Renamed Prairie State in 1941, she was eventually sold for scrapping in 1956. Wisconsin was broken up for scrap in 1922, while Alabama was expended as a target ship in September 1921 in bombing tests with the US Army Air Service.

== Design ==
Design work on what became the Illinois class began on 25 March 1896, when Rear Admiral J. G. Walker convened a board to consider future battleship designs. At the time, the only modern battleship in service was the low-freeboard Indiana; the high-freeboard battleship Iowa and the low-freeboard Kearsarge class were under construction. As the Navy had little experience with modern battleships, the question settled on whether to repeat one of the low-freeboard designs, which were suitable for coast defense, to build another Iowa, or to request a new design altogether. The Walker Board determined that another coastal battleship design would be imprudent, since the United States had long coastlines and therefore the new ships would need to have better seakeeping qualities than the Indiana or Kearsarge designs.

War games conducted by the fleet led the board to specify a draft of no more than 23 feet (7 m) to allow the ships to enter the comparatively shallow ports of the Gulf Coast. This limitation had a significant effect on the design; to meet it, weight would have to be kept to a minimum, which prevented copying the Iowa design outright, unless the main armament was reduced from 13-inch (330 mm) to 12 in (305 mm) guns. The board was unwilling to make that concession, and so a new design would be required. In addition, the board had determined that the 8 in (203 mm) secondary gun was unnecessary, since though it could penetrate the thinner casemate armor on enemy battleships, it could not deliver a high-explosive shell through the armor. Instead, the board decided that a new 6 in (152 mm) rapid-firing gun would be superior. It would also simplify the ammunition supply, since there would be only one secondary caliber.

The board determined that the armor layout of the Kearsarge design was sufficient and adopted it without change for the new ships. They discarded the superposed turrets of the Kearsarges, though, by mounting most of the secondary guns in a battery amidships. A new turret design for the main battery was adopted; instead of the old, round Monitor-style turrets of earlier ships, the Illinois' design featured a balanced turret with sloped armor on the face. Since it was balanced, it would prevent the ship from listing when the battery was trained to either broadside, as was the case with the Indianas. The US Congress authorized three new battleships on 10 June 1896; the Bureau of Construction and Repair issued its requests for tenders from the various American shipbuilding companies twelve days later. Contracts for the new ships, to be named Illinois, Alabama, and Wisconsin, were awarded on 28 August.

=== General characteristics and machinery ===
Plan and profile drawing of the Illinois class

The ships of the Illinois class were 368 feet (112 m) long at the waterline and 374 ft (114 m) long overall. They had a beam of 72 ft 3 in (22.02 m) and a draft of 23 ft 6 in (7.16 m). They displaced 11,565 long tons (11,751 t) as designed and up to 12,250 long tons (12,450 t) at full load. As built, they were fitted with heavy military masts, but these were replaced by cage masts in 1909. They had a crew of 40 officers and 496 enlisted men. The crew increased to 690–713 later in her career. Steering was controlled with a single rudder, and the ships had a turning radius of 362 yards (331 m) at a speed of 12 knots (22 km/h; 14 mph). The ships' transverse metacentric height was 2.7 feet (0.82 m).

The ships were powered by two-shaft triple-expansion steam engines rated at 10,000 indicated horsepower (7,500 kW). Steam was provided by eight coal-fired fire-tube boilers that were trunked into a pair of funnels that were arranged side-by-side. They were the last ships of the US Navy to use fire-tube boilers; subsequent designs changed to more efficient and lighter water-tube boilers. The engines generating a top speed of 16 knots (30 km/h; 18 mph), though they exceeded their rated performance on trials, with Illinois reaching 17.45 knots (32.32 km/h; 20.08 mph) on 12,757 ihp (9,513 kW). The ships could store up to 1,270 long tons (1,290 t) of coal, which allowed them to steam for 4,190 nautical miles (7,760 km; 4,820 mi) at a cruising speed of 10 knots (19 km/h; 12 mph).

=== Armament ===
The ships were armed with a main battery of four 13 in (330 mm)/35 caliber guns (Note: /35 refers to the length of the gun in terms of calibers. A /35 gun is 35 times long as it is in bore diameter.) guns in two twin gun turrets on the centerline, one forward and aft. These guns fired a 1,130-pound (510 kg) shell with a 500 lb (230 kg) brown powder charge, though this was replaced with a 180 lb (82 kg) smokeless powder charge, which produced a muzzle velocity of 2,000 feet per second (610 m/s). The gun had a range of 12,500 yards (11,400 m), though Navy regulations prescribed opening fire at 8,000 yards (7,300 m); even this was beyond the range at which gunners at the time could reliably hit. At a range of 2,000 yards (1,800 m), the shells could penetrate 20 inches (510 mm) of steel. The gun was slow-firing, requiring 320 seconds between shots. The guns were mounted in Mark IV turrets, which had a range of elevation of 15 degrees to -5 degrees. The turrets required the guns to return to 2 degrees for loading. Ammunition storage was 60 shells per gun.

The secondary battery consisted of fourteen 6 in (152 mm)/40 caliber Mark IV guns, which were placed in casemates in the hull. They fired a 105 lb (48 kg) shell at a muzzle velocity of 2,150 ft/s (660 m/s). For close-range defense against torpedo boats, they carried sixteen 57 mm (2.2 in) 6-pounder guns mounted in casemates along the side of the hull and six 37 mm (1.5 in) 1-pounder guns. These guns fired 6.03 lb (2.74 kg) and 1.088 lb (0.494 kg) shells, respectively. As was standard for capital ships of the period, the Illinois class carried four 18 in (457 mm) torpedo tubes in above-water, hull mounted torpedo launchers. Each ship carried a total of eight torpedoes. They were initially equipped with the Mark II Whitehead design, which carried a 140-pound (64 kg) warhead and had a range of 800 yards (730 m) at a speed of 27 knots (50 km/h; 31 mph).

=== Armor ===
All three ships were protected with Harvey armor; they were the last ships of the US Navy to rely entirely on Harvey steel. The ships' main armored belt was 16.5 in (419 mm) thick over the magazines and the machinery spaces and reduced to 9.5 in (241 mm) on the lower edge. It gradually reduced to 4 in (102 mm) toward the bow. Transverse bulkheads that were 12 in (305 mm) thick connected both ends of the central belt and the main battery barbettes. The ships' armored deck was 2.75 in (70 mm) thick on the flat portion, with 3 in (76 mm) thick sloped sides forward; the sloped sides aft were 5 in (127 mm) thick. The conning tower had 10 in thick sides with a 2 in (51 mm) thick roof.

The main battery gun turrets had 14-inch (356 mm) thick faces and 3 in (76 mm) thick roofs, and the supporting barbettes had 15 in (381 mm) of armor plating on their exposed sides. The portion of the barbettes that were behind the belt armor were reduced to 10 in (254 mm). Armor that was 6 in (152 mm) thick protected the secondary battery, and the lower half of the casemate armor was backed by coal bunkers, which increased the level of protection. Anti-splinter bulkheads that were 1.5 in (38 mm) thick were placed between each of the secondary guns to reduce the possibility of one shell from disabling multiple guns.

== Ships in class ==
Construction data
Name	Builder	Laid down	Launched	Commissioned
USS Illinois (BB-7)	Newport News Shipbuilding & Drydock Company	10 February 1897	4 October 1898	16 September 1901
USS Alabama (BB-8)	William Cramp & Sons	2 December 1896	18 May 1898	16 October 1900
USS Wisconsin (BB-9)	Union Iron Works	9 February 1897	26 November 1898	4 February 1901

== Service history ==
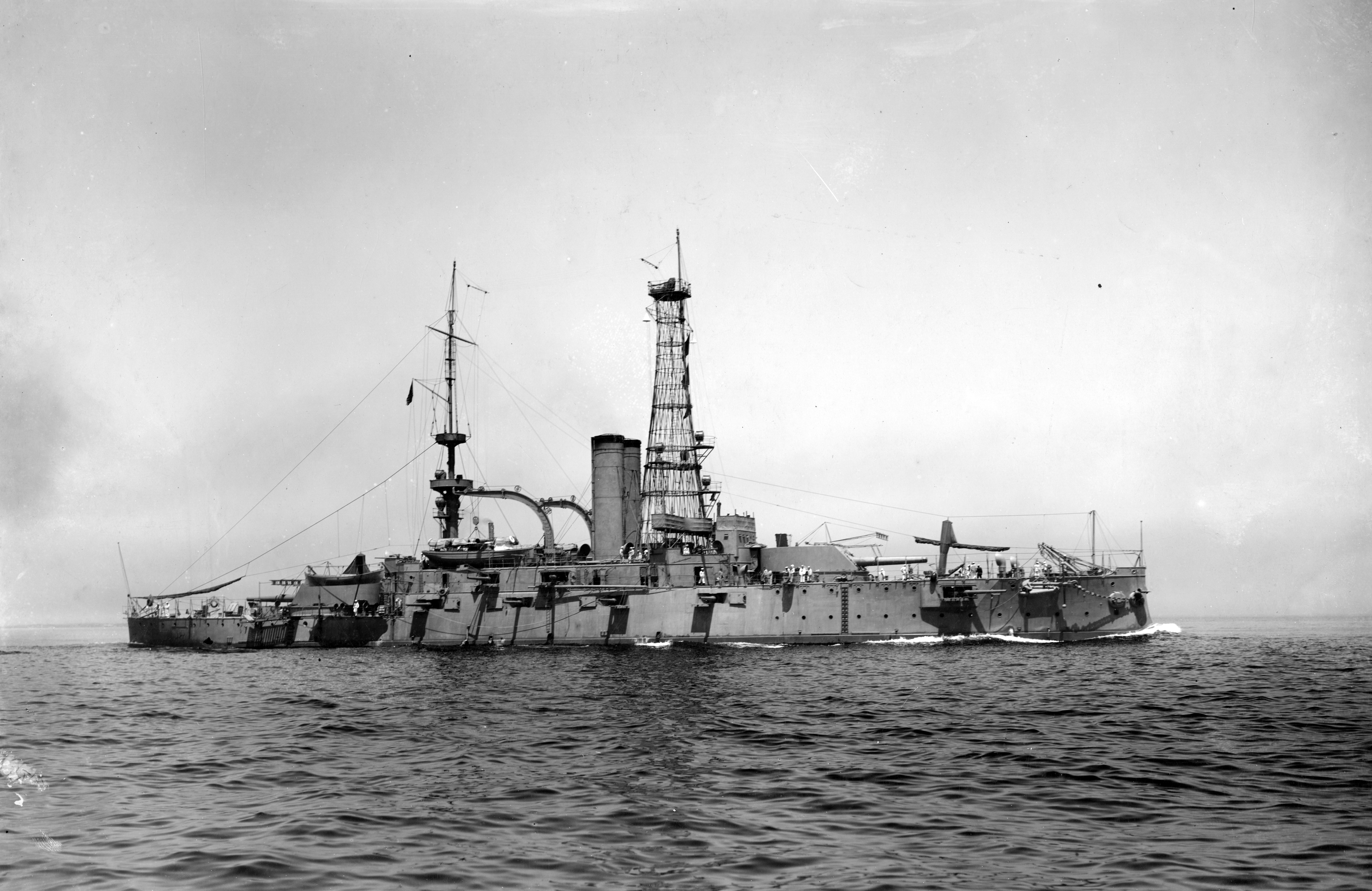
Wisconsin c. 1909–10 after her modernization

From their commissioning, Alabama and Illinois served with the North Atlantic Squadron. Both ships made visits to Europe during their early careers, and Illinois served as the flagship of the European Squadron for a short time in 1902. She accidentally ran aground outside Oslo, Norway, in 1902 and returned to the North Atlantic Squadron in January 1903. Wisconsin, having been built on the west coast of the United States, instead served in the Pacific Fleet as its flagship. In 1903, she was transferred to the Asiatic Fleet, and remained there until late 1906 when she returned to California. (Note: See the DANFS entries for Illinois, Alabama, and Wisconsin,)

Illinois and Alabama steamed with the Great White Fleet on its world cruise that started in December 1907. Wisconsin joined the fleet after it had rounded South America in July 1908; Alabama had to leave the fleet owing to engine damage that required repairs. Alabama was detached along with the battleship Maine; the two ships continued the journey independently and on a greatly shortened itinerary. The rest of the ships then crossed the Pacific and stopped in Australia, the Philippines, and Japan before continuing on through the Indian Ocean. They transited the Suez Canal and toured the Mediterranean before crossing the Atlantic, arriving bank in Hampton Roads on 22 February 1909 for a naval review with President Theodore Roosevelt.

The three ships were modernized after their return in 1909; from 1912, they were placed in reserve commission and employed as training ships for midshipmen from the US Naval Academy and naval militia units. They continued in this role through World War I, which the United States entered on 6 April 1917. The ships trained engine room personnel, armed guards for merchant ships, and other specialties. Following the German surrender in November 1918, most of the battleships of the Atlantic Fleet were used as transports to ferry American soldiers back from France. The Illinois-class ships were not so employed, however, owing to their short range and small size, which would not permit sufficient additional accommodations.

The Illinois-class ships served with the fleet only briefly after the war, still as training ships. By 1920, they had all been decommissioned. Wisconsin was sold for scrapping in January 1922 and broken up for scrap. Illinois was instead converted into a floating armory for the New York Naval Militia; renamed Prairie State in 1941, she served in this role until 1956, when she too was sold for scrap. Alabama met a more spectacular end as a target ship for bombing experiments conducted with the US Army Air Service in September 1921. She was hit with several bombs, including white phosphorus weapons and 2,000-pound (910 kg) armor-piercing bombs, before eventually foundering.
