= USS Kentucky (BB-6) =

Kearsarge-class pre-dreadnought battleship of the United States Navy

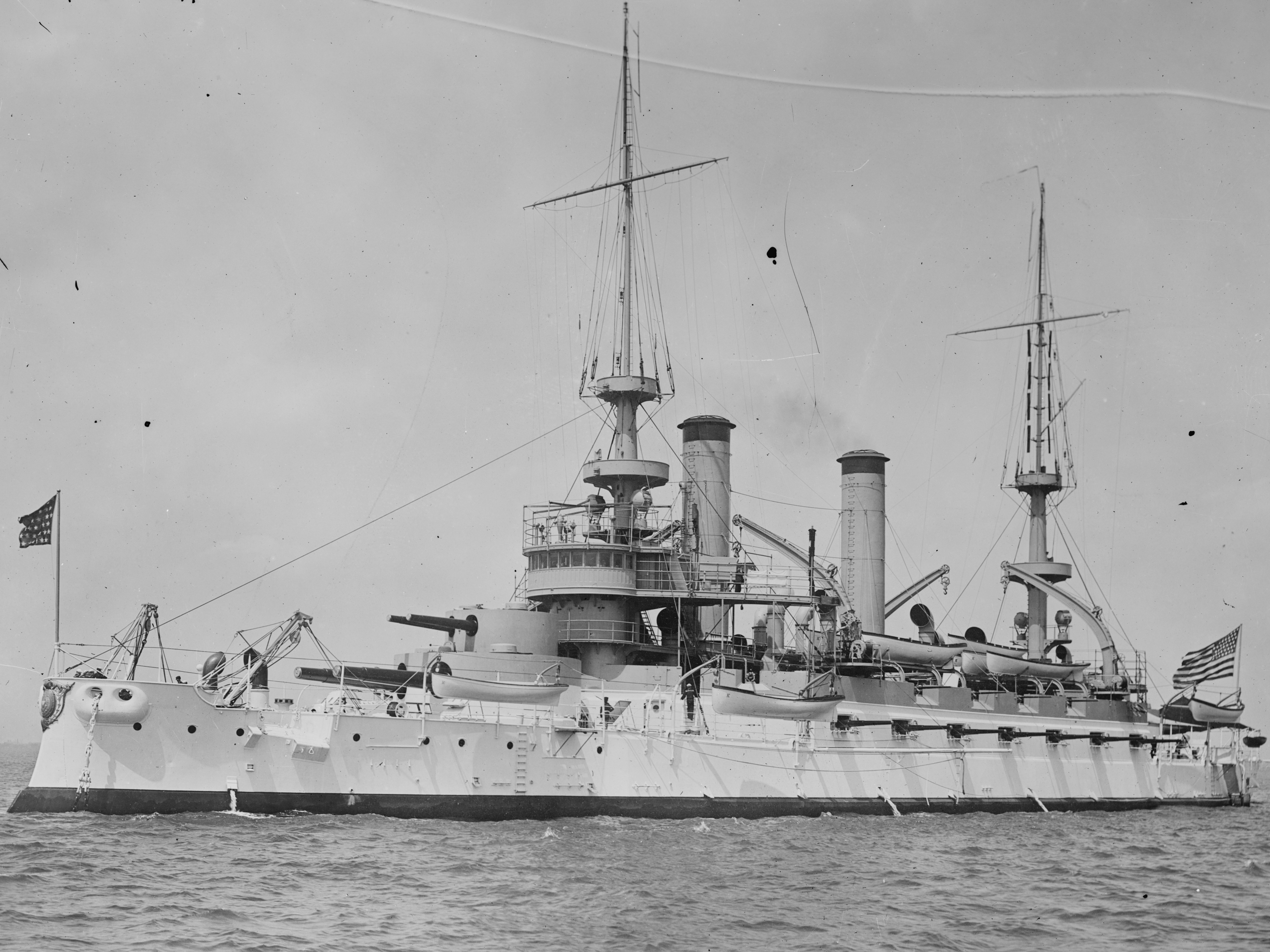
- USS Kentucky, circa 1915-1920

History

United States
- Name: Kentucky
- Namesake: Kentucky
- Ordered: 2 March 1895
- Awarded: 2 January 1896
- Builder: Newport News SB&DD
- Laid down: 30 June 1896
- Launched: 24 March 1898
- Commissioned: 15 May 1900
- Decommissioned: 29 May 1920
- Stricken: 27 May 1922
- Identification: Hull symbol: BB-6
- Fate: Sold for scrap, 24 March 1923

General characteristics
- Class & type: Kearsarge-class pre-dreadnought battleship
- Displacement: 11,540 short tons (10,470 t)
- Length: 375 ft 4 in (114.40 m)
- Beam: 72 ft 3 in (22.02 m)
- Draft: 23 ft 6 in (7.16 m)
- Installed power: 5 boilers, 12,179 ihp (9,082 kW)
- Propulsion: 2 VTE engines, 2 propeller shafts
- Speed: 16.9 knots (31.3 km/h; 19.4 mph)
- Complement: 60 officers and 514 enlisted men
- Armament: 4 × 13 in (330 mm)/35 caliber guns; 4 × 8 in (203 mm)/35 caliber guns; 14 × 5 in (127 mm)/40 caliber guns; 20 × 6-pounders (57 mm or 2.2 in); 8 × 1-pounders (37 mm or 1.5 in); 4 × .30 in (7.6 mm) machine guns; 4 × 18 in (457 mm) torpedo tubes
- Armor: Belt: 5–16.5 in (127–419 mm); Barbettes: 12.5–15 in (318–381 mm); Turret (primary): 15–17 in (381–432 mm); Turret (secondary): 6–11 in (152–279 mm); Conning tower: 10 in (254 mm)

USS Kentucky (hull number: BB-6), was the second and final Kearsarge-class pre-dreadnought battleship built for the United States Navy in the 1890s. Designed for coastal defense, the Kearsarge-class battleships had a low freeboard and heavy armor. The ships carried an armament of four 13-inch (330 mm) and four 8-inch (203 mm) guns in an unusual two-story turret arrangement. The Newport News Shipbuilding Company of Virginia laid down her keel on 30 June 1896. She was launched on 24 March 1898 and was commissioned on 15 May 1900.

In her 20 years of service, Kentucky participated in no combat. Between 1901 and 1904, she served in East Asia, and from 1904 to 1907, she cruised the Atlantic. In 1907, she joined the Great White Fleet on its world tour, returning to the United States in 1909. She was modernized between 1909 and 1911, but did not operate again until 1915, when she sailed to the Mexican coast to participate in the American intervention in the Mexican Revolution, where she stayed until 1916. From 1917 until her decommissioning on 29 May 1920, she served as a training ship. She was sold for scrap on 24 March 1923.

== Design ==
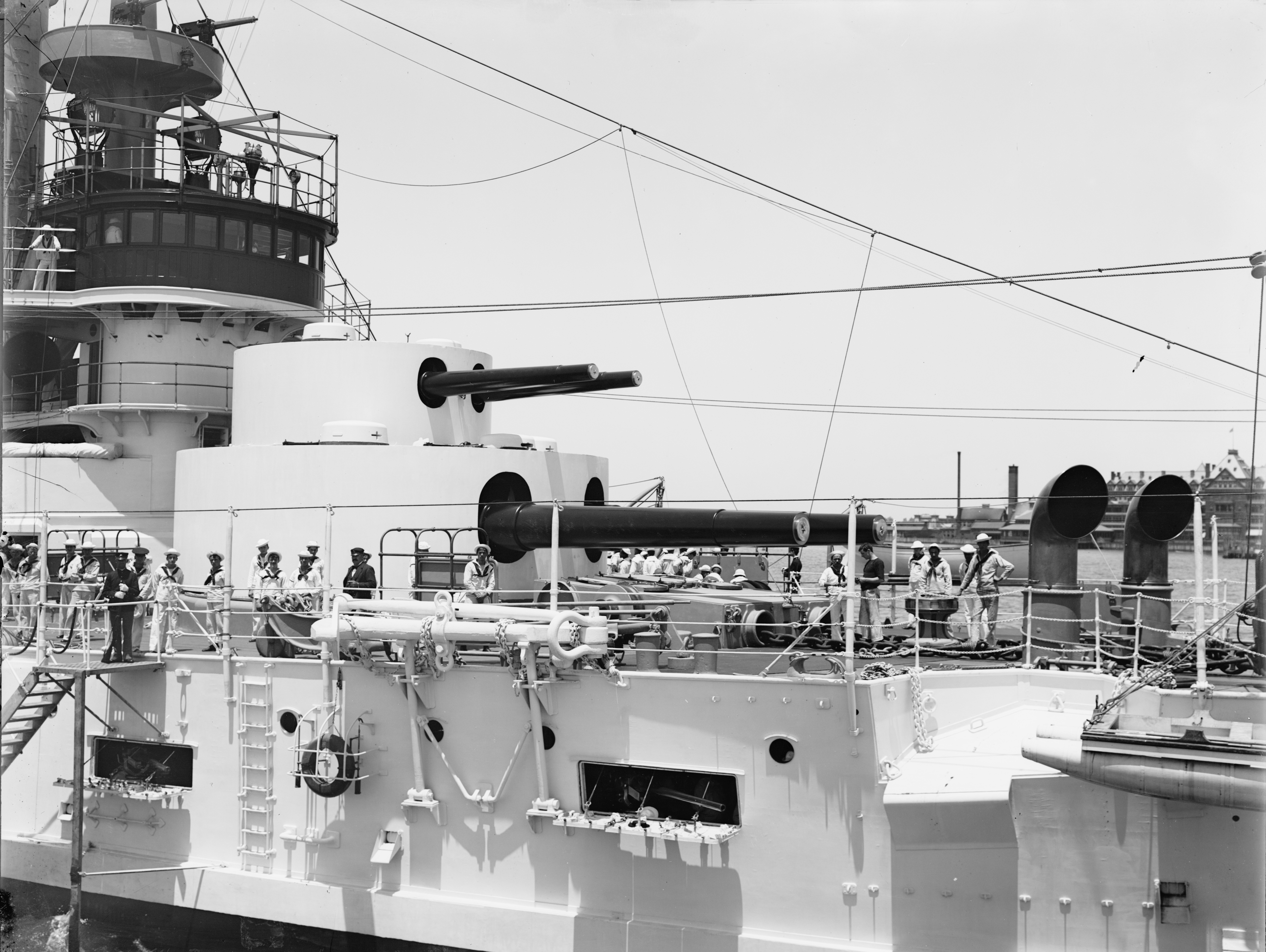
Kentucky's double turret, c. 1900–1901

The Kearsarge-class battleships were designed to be used for coastal defense. They had a displacement of 11,540 short tons (10,470 t), an overall length of 375 feet 4 inches (114.40 m), a beam of 72 feet 3 inches (22.02 m), and a draft of 23 feet 6 inches (7.16 m). The two 3-cylinder vertical triple-expansion steam engines and five Scotch boilers, connected to two propeller shafts, produced a total of 12,179 indicated horsepower (9,082 kW), and gave a maximum speed of 16.897 knots (19.445 mph; 31.293 km/h). Kentucky was manned by 40 officers and 514 enlisted men, a total of 554 crew.

Kentucky, like USS Kearsarge, had two double turrets, with two 13 in (330 mm)/35 caliber guns and two 8 in (203 mm)/40 caliber guns each, stacked on two levels. The guns and turret armor were designed by the Bureau of Ordnance, while the turret itself was designed by the Bureau of Construction and Repair. The configuration caused the guns to be mounted far back in the turret, making the ports very large. Admiral William Sims claimed that as a result of the gun mounting, a shell fired into the port could reach the magazines below, disabling the guns. In addition to these guns, Kentucky carried fourteen 5 in (127 mm)/40 caliber guns, twenty 6-pounder (57 mm or 2.2 in) guns, eight 1-pounder (37 mm or 1.5 in) guns, four .30 in (7.6 mm) machine guns, and four 18 in (457 mm) torpedo tubes. Kentucky had a very low freeboard, often making her guns unusable during bad weather.

The ship's waterline armor belt was 5.0–16.5 inches (127–419 mm) thick. Her main gun turrets were protected by 15–17 inches (381–432 mm) of armor, while the secondary turrets had 6–11 inches (152–279 mm) of armor. The barbettes were 12.5–15.0 inches (318–381 mm) thick, and the conning tower had 10 inches (254 mm) of armor. The ship's armor was made of harveyized steel.

== Construction ==
Kentucky was authorized on 2 March 1895. The contract for her construction was awarded on 2 January 1896, and her keel was laid down on 30 June 1896 by Newport News Shipbuilding & Dry Dock Company in Virginia. The total cost was $4,998,119.43. In preparation for the Kentucky's christening, the Navy asked Kentucky Governor William O'Connell Bradley to select a member of his family to perform the ceremony. Bradley chose his daughter, Christine, who was attending school in Washington, DC, The Bradleys were a family of teetotalers, so Governor Bradley sent a bottle of water from Lincoln Spring in Hodgenville, Kentucky, for Christine to use during the ceremony. Kentucky was christened on 24 March 1898, the same day as her sister ship, Kearsarge. Soon after Miss Bradley broke the bottle of water over the Kentucky's bow, a delegation from the Women's Christian Temperance Union, led by Frances Beauchamp, presented the governor's daughter with a gift of a silver tray, a water pitcher, and two goblets. The inscription read, "Kentucky Christian Temperance Union to Miss Christine Bradley, as a tribute to her loyalty to conviction in the christening of the Battleship Kentucky with water. March 10, 1898." Kentucky was commissioned on 15 May 1900, under the command of Captain Colby Mitchell Chester.

== Service history ==
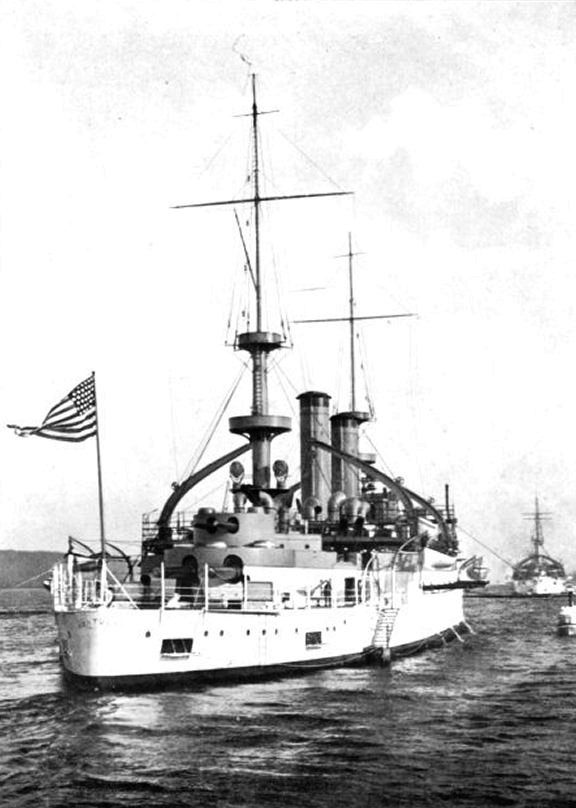
Kentucky at Sydney, as part of the Great White Fleet, late August 1908. Kentucky shows the white hull after which the fleet was named.

During the summer of 1900, Kentucky was fitted out in the New York Navy Yard. On 26 October, during the Boxer Rebellion, she left Tompkinsville, Staten Island, for China, passing through Gibraltar and the Suez Canal. On 5 February 1901, she arrived at Manila, and on 23 March, she replaced the protected cruiser Newark as the flagship of Rear Admiral Louis Kempff. Between 1901 and 1904, Kentucky visited numerous ports in China and Japan, including Yantai, Wusong, Nanjing, Taku Forts, Hong Kong, Xiamen, Nagasaki, Kobe, and Yokohama. In 1902, Kentucky became the flagship of Rear Admiral Frank Wildes, although he moved his flag to the distilling ship Rainbow on 12 April 1902. In November 1902, she became the flagship of Rear Admiral Robley D. Evans.

On 13 March 1904, she sailed from Manila, passing through the Suez Canal and the Strait of Gibraltar, and arriving at New York City on 21 May. After receiving upgrades at the New York Navy Yard, including the addition of smoke ejectors, Kentucky joined the North Atlantic Squadron. The battleship participated in the welcome of the British North Atlantic Squadron at Annapolis, Maryland, in October 1905. During the 1906 Cuban Insurrection, she carried Marines to Cuba, embarked them from Provincetown on 23 September, and landed them at Havana, Cuba, on 1 October. She remained there until 9 October, and then returned to New England. Kentucky attended the Jamestown Exposition at Norfolk, Virginia, on 15 April 1907, and then participated in exercises off the New England coast.

=== Great White Fleet ===
In 1907, the Great White Fleet was ordered by U.S. President Theodore Roosevelt to circle the world, as a demonstration of the might of the United States Navy. Kentucky was attached to the Fourth Division of the Second Squadron and was commanded by Captain Walter C. Cowles, while the fleet as a whole was commanded by Rear Admiral Evans, Kentucky's former flag officer. On 16 December 1907, the fleet saluted the presidential yacht Mayflower, and left from Hampton Roads. The fleet then sailed south, passing Trinidad and Rio de Janeiro, and going through the Straits of Magellan. From there, she passed the west coast of South America, visiting Punta Arenas and Valparaíso, Chile, Callao, Peru, and Magdalena Bay, Mexico. The fleet arrived at San Diego on 14 April 1908 and continued to San Francisco on 6 May. Two months later, the fleet arrived at Honolulu, and from there sailed to Auckland, New Zealand, arriving on 9 August. On 20 August, the fleet reached Sydney, Australia, and a week later sailed for Melbourne.

Kentucky departed Albany, Western Australia, on 18 September, passing through ports in the Philippine Islands, Japan, China, and Ceylon before traveling through the Suez Canal. The fleet split at Port Said on 8 January 1909, with Kentucky visiting Tripoli and Algiers before rejoining the other ships at Gibraltar. She returned to Hampton Roads on 22 February and was inspected by President Roosevelt.

=== Later service ===
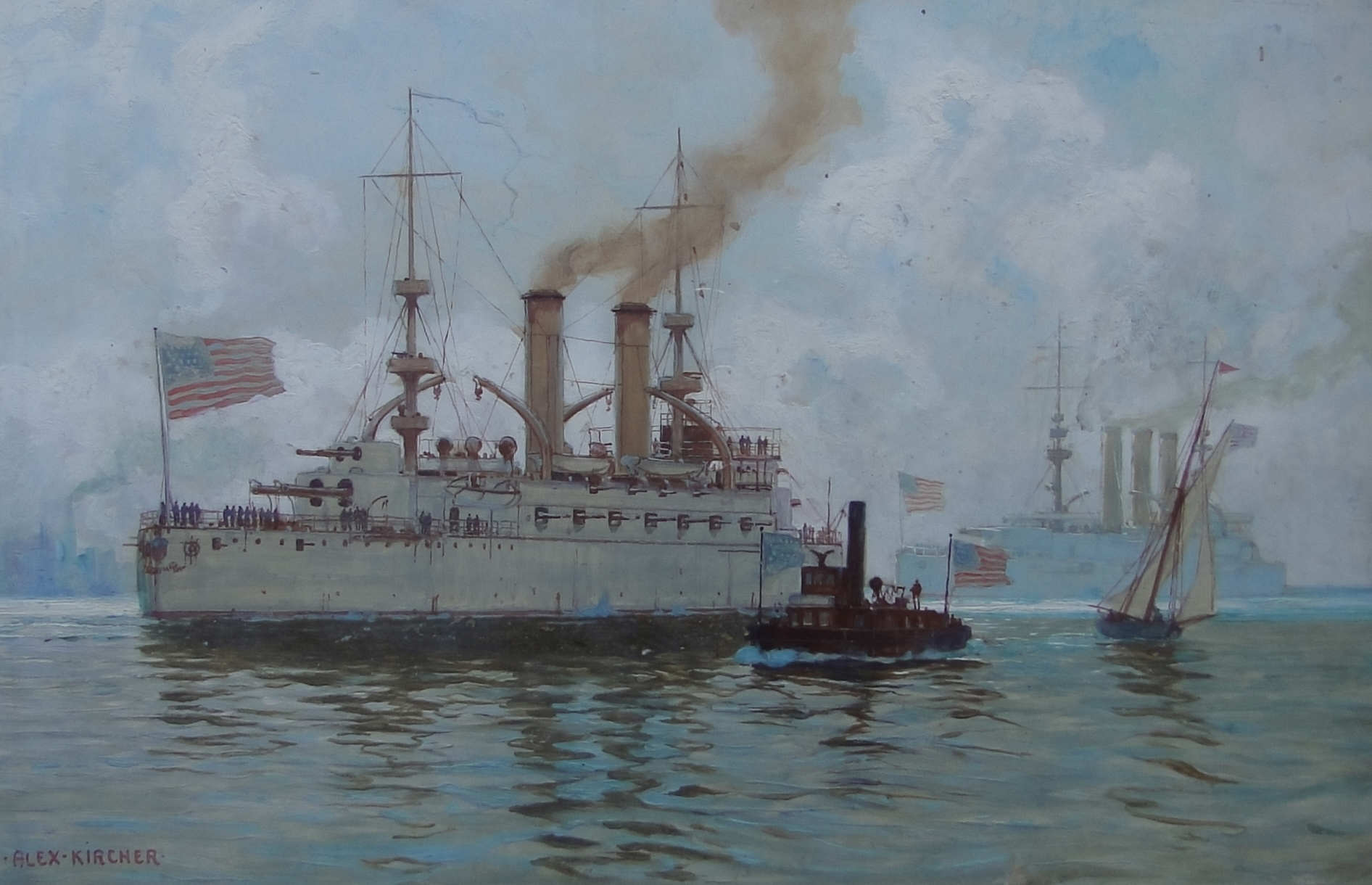
Kentucky, painting by marine painter Alexander Kircher, c. 1908

As with most of the Great White Fleet ships, Kentucky was modernized on her return. She was decommissioned at the Philadelphia Naval Shipyard on 28 August 1909, and her modernization was completed in 1911, at a cost of $675,000. The ship received cage masts, new water-tube boilers, and another four 5-inch guns. The 1-pounder guns were removed, as were 16 of the 6-pounders. On 4 June 1912, she was recommissioned in the Second Reserve, and on 31 May 1913, she was transferred to the Atlantic Reserve Fleet in Philadelphia.

She was recommissioned again at Philadelphia on 23 June 1915. On 11 September that year, following the United States occupation of Veracruz, she sailed to Mexico, arriving at Veracruz on 28 September. She remained there during the Mexican Revolution, staying until 2 June 1916, except for a visit to New Orleans for the Mardi Gras festival in March 1916. The battleship stopped at Guantanamo Bay Naval Base and Santo Domingo on her way back to Philadelphia, arriving there on 18 June 1916. From July until September, she trained militiamen near Block Island and Boston. On 2 October Kentucky returned to New York, and entered the New York Naval Shipyard on 2 January 1917, remaining there until the United States entered World War I. She arrived at Yorktown, Virginia, on 2 May and trained recruits along the Atlantic coast from Chesapeake Bay to Long Island Sound. During the war, she trained several thousand men, in 15 groups of recruits.

Kentucky was overhauled at the Boston Navy Yard beginning on 20 December 1918. On 18 March 1919, she left for exercises in Guantánamo Bay, Norfolk, and along the New England coast. Between 29 May and 30 August 1919, Kentucky trained United States Naval Academy midshipmen. Following World War I, the United States agreed to the Washington Naval Treaty, which was aimed at preventing a naval arms race by limiting the size of the signatories' fleets. As a result, many old and obsolete ships were scrapped, including Kentucky. Kentucky was decommissioned on 29 May 1920. Her name was struck from the Naval Vessel Register on 27 May 1922, and she was sold for scrap to Dravo Corporation on 24 March 1923.

== Bibliography ==
=== Books ===
- Albertson, Mark (2007). U. S. S. Connecticut: Constitution State Battleship. Tate Publishing & Enterprises. ISBN 978-1-59886-739-8.
- Albertson, Mark (2008). They'll Have to Follow You!: The Triumph of the Great White Fleet. Tate Publishing & Enterprises. ISBN 978-1-60462-145-7.
- Breyer, Siegfried (1973). Battleships and Battlecruisers of the World, 1905–1970. Macdonald and Jane's. ISBN 0-356-04191-3.
- Campbell, N. J. M. (1979). "United States of America — 'The Old Navy' 1860–1882". In Chesneau, Roger & Kolesnik, Eugene M. (eds.). Conway's All the World's Fighting Ships 1860–1905. Mayflower Books. pp. 114–136. ISBN 0-8317-0302-4.
- Clark, Thomas D. & Lane, Margaret A. (2002). The People's House: Governor's Mansions of Kentucky. University Press of Kentucky. ISBN 0-8131-2253-8.
- Crawford, Michael J. (2008). The World Cruise of the Great White Fleet: Honoring 100 Years of Global Partnerships and Security. United States Government Printing Office. ISBN 978-0-945274-59-9.
- Friedman, Norman (1985). U.S. Battleships, An Illustrated Design History. Naval Institute Press. ISBN 0-87021-715-1.
- Harris, James Russell (1992). "Kentucky, U.S.S.". In Kleber, John E. (ed.). The Kentucky Encyclopedia. The University Press of Kentucky. p. 489. ISBN 0-8131-1772-0.
- Newhart, Max R. (1995). American Battleships: A Pictorial History of BB-1 to BB-71. Pictorial Histories Publishing Company. ISBN 978-1-57510-004-3.
- Reilly, John C. & Scheina, Robert L. (1980). American Battleships 1886–1923: Predreadnought Design and Construction. Naval Institute Press. ISBN 0-87021-524-8.
- Yarsinske, Amy Waters (1 July 1999). Jamestown Exposition, Virginia: American Imperialism on Parade. Vol. 2. Arcadia Publishing. ISBN 0-7385-0167-0.

=== Newspapers ===
- "Kentucky is Launched" (PDF). Houston Daily Post. 25 March 1898. p. 4.
- "The Kentucky in Commission" (PDF). Alexandria Gazette. 15 May 1900. p. 2.
- "Condensed Telegrams" (PDF). The Honolulu Republican. 8 November 1900. p. 2.
- "A Slight War Cloud" (PDF). The Weekly Messenger. St. Martinville, Louisiana. 17 November 1900. p. 2.
- "Kentucky in Suez Canal" (PDF). The San Francisco Call. 22 December 1900. p. 3.
- "The Kentucky at Manila" (PDF). The Bee. Earlington, Kentucky. 7 February 1901. p. 6.
- "Movements of Naval Vessels" (PDF). Evening Star. Washington, D.C. 23 March 1901. p. 2.
- "Washington Notes" (PDF). The Saint Paul Globe. 15 October 1901. p. 1.
- "Flagship New York Sails for Cavite" (PDF). The San Francisco Call. 29 October 1901. p. 3.
- "Two Admirals in the East" (PDF). Evening Star. Washington, D.C. 3 June 1901. p. 1.
- "Movements of Naval Vessels" (PDF). The Washington Times. 24 July 1902. p. 7.
- "Admiral Kempff at Hong Kong" (PDF). Evening Star. Washington, D.C. 14 November 1901. p. 7.
- "Movements of Naval Vessels" (PDF). The Washington Times. 29 June 1902. p. 6.
- "Change in Flagships" (PDF). The Washington Times. 13 April 1902. p. 7.
- "Armored Cruiser New York Arrives" (PDF). Evening Bulletin. Honolulu. 8 November 1902. p. 1.
- "Kentucky Breaks Record of World" (PDF). Daily Public Ledger. Maysville, Kentucky. 26 May 1904. p. 3.
- "Safety Device for Naval Gunners" (PDF). Palestine Daily Herald. Palestine, Texas. 26 October 1904. p. 5.
- "Go to Meet the Prince" (PDF). The Salt Lake Tribune. 31 October 1905. p. 10.
- "Army and Navy Get Ready" (PDF). The Sun. New York City. 26 September 1906. p. 5.
- "Warships Leave Havana" (PDF). The Bemidji Daily Pioneer. 9 October 1906. p. 4.
- "Movements of Naval Vessels" (PDF). The Sun. New York City. 6 June 1916. p. 13.
- "Many States Send Naval Militiamen for Practise Cruise on Battleships" (PDF). The Ogden Standard. 25 July 1916. p. 9.
- "Civilians Off on Navy Practice Cruise" (PDF). The Ogden Standard. 19 August 1916. p. 3.
- "Naval Training Cruise" (PDF). Kentucky Irish American. 2 September 1916. p. 4.
- "Movements of Naval Vessels" (PDF). The Sun. New York City. 3 January 1917. p. 12.
- "Scrapped American Battleship to Sink With Honors of War" (PDF). New York Tribune. 15 January 1922. p. 12.

=== Journals ===
- Bogart, Charles H. (March 2010). "USS Kentucky (BB 6) at Vera Cruz, Mexico 1915–1916" (PDF). Universal Ship Cancellation Society Log. Universal Ship Cancellation Society: 14–16. Archived from the original (PDF) on 3 June 2012.

=== Online resources ===
- "Kentucky". Dictionary of American Naval Fighting Ships. Navy Department, Naval History and Heritage Command.
- "USS Kentucky (BB 6)". Naval Vessel Register. United States Navy.
