= USS Massachusetts (BB-2) =

Indiana-class battleship of the United States Navy

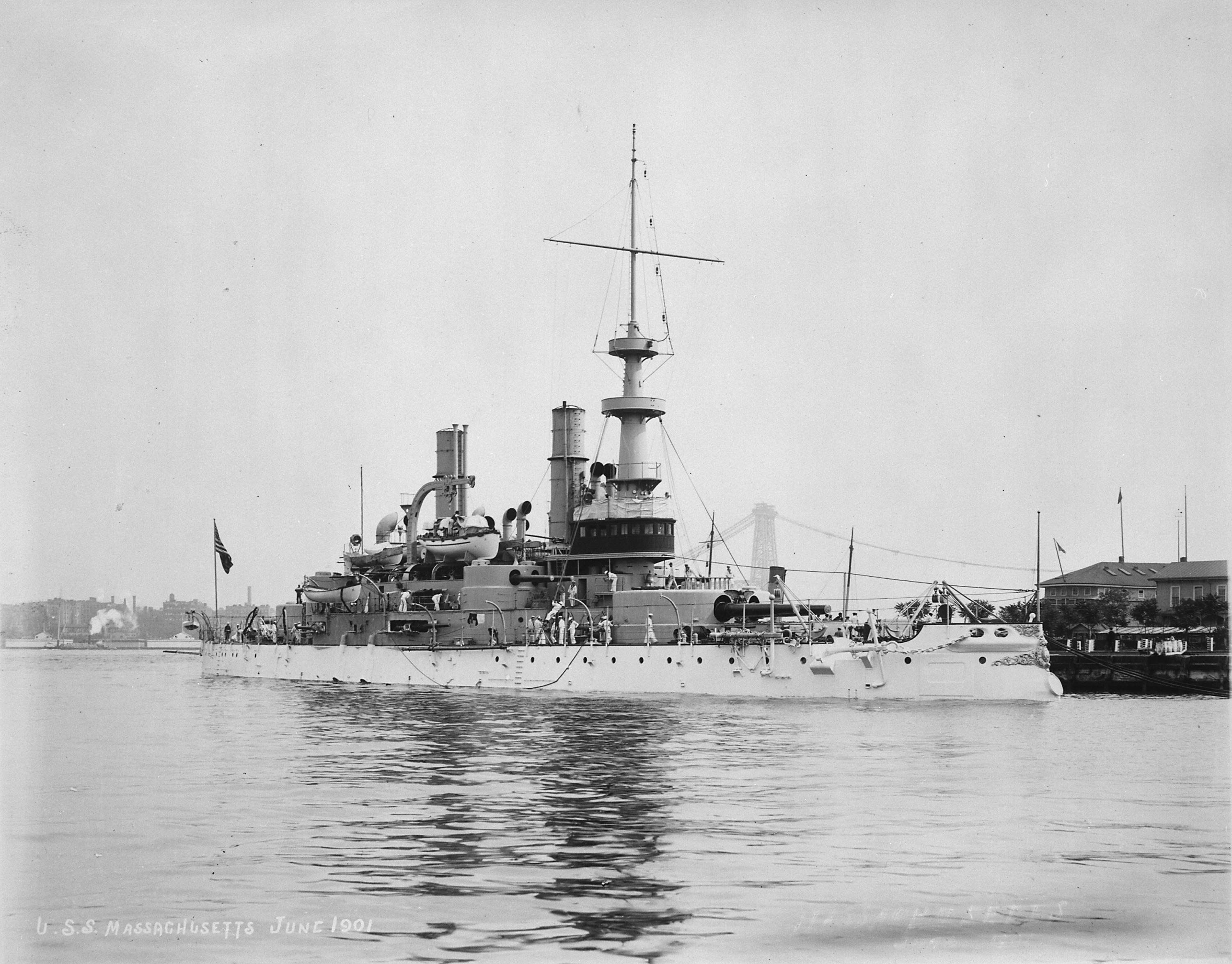
- Massachusetts in 1901

History

United States
- Name: Massachusetts
- Namesake: Massachusetts
- Ordered: 30 June 1890
- Builder: William Cramp & Sons, Philadelphia
- Laid down: 25 June 1891
- Launched: 10 June 1893
- Commissioned: 10 June 1896
- Decommissioned: 8 January 1906
- Recommissioned: 2 May 1910
- Decommissioned: 23 May 1914
- Recommissioned: 9 June 1917
- Renamed: Coast Battleship Number 2 29 March 1919
- Decommissioned: 31 March 1919
- Stricken: 22 November 1920
- Fate: Scuttled, 6 January 1921

General characteristics
- Class & type: Indiana-class pre-dreadnought battleship
- Displacement: 10,288 long tons (10,453 t) standard
- Length: 350 ft 11 in (107.0 m)
- Beam: 69 ft 3 in (21.1 m)
- Draft: 27 ft (8.2 m)
- Installed power: 9,000 ihp (6,700 kW) (design); 4 × Scotch boilers
- Propulsion: 2 × triple-expansion steam engines; 2 × shafts
- Speed: 15 knots (28 km/h; 17 mph) (design)
- Range: 4,900 nmi (9,100 km; 5,600 mi) (Note: Experimental data for Indiana and Massachusetts was lumped together and the rounded average calculated. See Bryan 1901.)
- Complement: 473 officers and men
- Armament: 2 × twin 13 in (330 mm)/35 caliber guns; 4 × twin 8 in (203 mm)/35 caliber guns; 4 × single 6 in (152 mm)/40 caliber guns; 20 × single 6-pounder (57 mm (2.24 in)) guns; 6 × single 1-pounder (37 mm (1.46 in)) guns; 4 × 18 in (457 mm) torpedo tubes (Note: Sources conflict on this. Reilly & Scheina claim first that Massachusetts had five tubes, but give three in their data table. DANFS says six tubes, while Friedman states the contract called for seven tubes, but Massachusetts was completed with five.)
- Armor: Belt: 18–8.5 in (457–216 mm); 13" turrets: 15 in (381 mm); Hull: 5 in (127 mm); 8" turrets: 6 in (152 mm); Conning Tower: 10 in (254 mm); Deck: 3 in (76 mm)
- USS Massachusetts (BB-2)
- U.S. National Register of Historic Places
- Location within Florida
- Location: Escambia County, Florida, US
- Nearest city: Pensacola, Florida, US
- Coordinates: 30°17′49″N 87°18′41″W
- Area: c. 1 acre (0.40 ha)
- NRHP reference No.: 01000528
- FUAP No.: 4
- Added to NRHP: 31 May 2001

USS Massachusetts was an Indiana-class, pre-dreadnought battleship and the second United States Navy ship comparable to foreign battleships of its time. Authorized in 1890, and commissioned six years later, she was a small battleship, though with heavy armor and ordnance. The ship class also pioneered the use of an intermediate battery. She was designed for coastal defense and as a result, her decks were not safe from high waves on the open ocean.

Massachusetts served in the Spanish–American War as part of the Flying Squadron and took part in the blockades of Cienfuegos and Santiago de Cuba. She missed the decisive Battle of Santiago de Cuba after steaming to Guantánamo Bay the night before to resupply coal. After the war she served with the North Atlantic Squadron, performing training maneuvers and gunnery practice. During this period she suffered an explosion in an 8-inch (203 mm) gun turret, killing nine, and ran aground twice, requiring several months of repair both times. She was decommissioned in 1906, for modernization.

Although considered obsolete in 1910, the battleship was recommissioned and used for annual cruises for midshipmen during the summers, and otherwise laid up in the reserve fleet, until her decommissioning in 1914. In 1917, she was recommissioned to serve as a training ship for gun crews during World War I. She was decommissioned for the final time in March 1919, under the name Coast Battleship Number 2 in anticipation that her name could be reused for USS Massachusetts (BB-54) (laid down April 1921). In 1921, she was scuttled in shallow water in the Gulf of Mexico, off Pensacola, Florida, and used as a target for experimental artillery. The wreck was never scrapped, and in 1956, it was declared the property of the State of Florida. Since 1993, the wreck has been a Florida Underwater Archaeological Preserve and it is included in the National Register of Historic Places. It serves as an artificial reef and diving spot.

== Design ==
Massachusetts was constructed from a modified version of a design drawn up by a policy board in 1889 for a short-range battleship. The original design was part of an ambitious naval construction plan to build 33 battleships and 167 smaller ships. The United States Congress saw the plan as an attempt to end the US policy of isolationism and did not approve it, but a year later approved funding for three coast defense battleships, which would become Massachusetts and her sister ships Indiana and Oregon. The ships were limited to coastal defense due to their moderate endurance, relatively small displacement and low freeboard which limited seagoing capability. The ships proved to be disappointments in service, as they were badly overweight upon completion, their low freeboard hampered operations at sea, and they handled poorly. Conway's All the World's Fighting Ships describes her design as "attempting too much on a very limited displacement." They were nevertheless the first modern battleships for the American fleet.

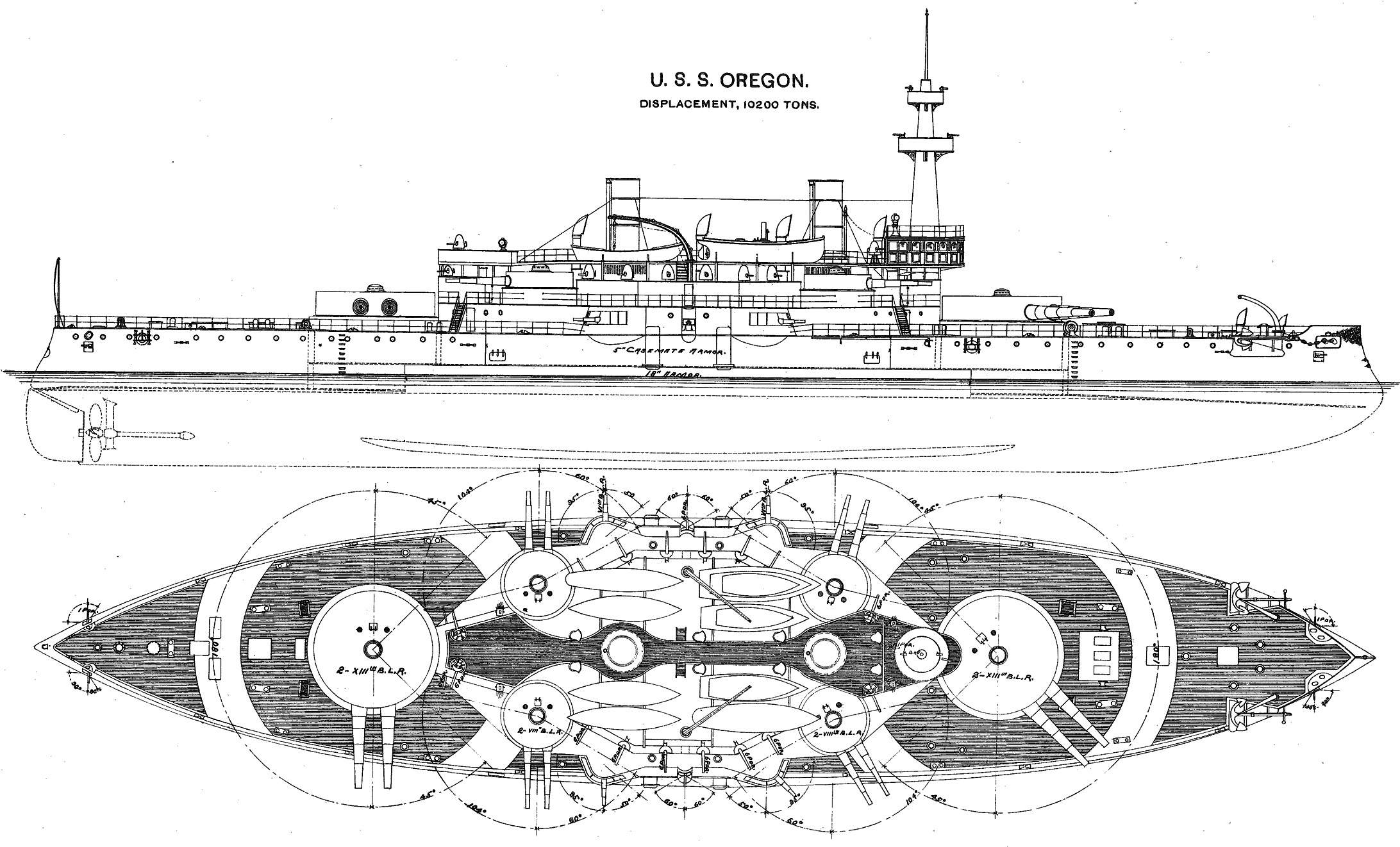
Plan and profile illustration of Oregon, one of the Indiana-class battleships

Massachusetts was 351 feet 2 inches (107.04 m) long overall and had a beam of 69 ft 3 in (21.11 m) and a draft of 24 ft (7.3 m). She displaced 10,288 long tons (10,453 t) as designed and up to 11,688 long tons (11,876 t) at full load. The ship was powered by two-shaft triple-expansion steam engines rated at 9,000 indicated horsepower (6,700 kW) and four coal-fired fire-tube boilers, generating a top speed of 15 knots (28 km/h; 17 mph). She had a cruising radius of 5,640 nautical miles (10,450 km; 6,490 mi) at a speed of 10 knots (19 km/h; 12 mph). As built, she was fitted with a heavy military mast, this was later supplemented by a stern cage mast in 1910–1911. She had a crew of 32 officers and 441 enlisted men, which increased to a total of 586–636 officers and enlisted.

The ship was armed with a main battery of four 13 in (330 mm) /35 caliber guns in two twin gun turrets on the centerline, one forward and aft. The secondary battery consisted of eight 8-inch (203 mm) /35 cal. guns, which were placed in four twin wing turrets. These were supported by a battery of six 6 in (150 mm) /40 cal. guns in a casemate battery amidships. For close-range defense against torpedo boats, she carried twenty 6-pounder guns and six 1-pounder guns in individual mounts. As was standard for capital ships of the period, Massachusetts carried 18 in (457 mm) torpedo tubes in above-water mounts, though the number is unclear. According to Conway's, she was fitted with six tubes, though the naval historian Norman Friedman states she was ordered with seven but completed with five.

Massachusetts's main armored belt was 18 in (457 mm) thick over the magazines and the machinery spaces and was reduced to 4 in (102 mm) at the bow and stern. The main battery gun turrets had 17-inch (432 mm) thick sides, and the supporting barbettes had the same thickness of armor plate on their exposed sides. The 8 in turrets had 6 in of armor plating and the casemate battery had 5 in (127 mm). The conning tower had 10 in (254 mm) thick sides.

== Service history ==
=== Construction and early career ===
Construction of the ships was authorized on 30 June 1890, and the contract for Massachusetts—not including guns and armor—was awarded to William Cramp & Sons of Philadelphia, who offered to build it for $3,020,000. The total cost of the ship was almost twice as high, approximately $6,000,000. The contract specified the ship had to be built in three years, but slow delivery of armor plates and guns caused a delay. Her keel was laid down on 25 June 1891, and she was launched two years later on 10 June 1893. The launching ceremony was attended by thousands of people, including Secretary of the Navy Hilary A. Herbert, and Commander George Dewey. Her preliminary sea trial did not take place until March 1896, because of the delays in armor and gun deliveries. At this point Massachusetts was almost complete, and her official trial was held a month later.

Massachusetts was commissioned on 10 June 1896, with Captain Frederick Rodgers in command. She had her shakedown cruise between August and November 1896, followed by an overhaul at the New York Navy Yard. In February 1897, she made a short voyage to Charleston, South Carolina. The battleship departed New York, again in May, for Boston, where a celebration in her honor was held. For the next ten months the warship participated in training maneuvers with the North Atlantic Squadron, off the coast of Florida, and visited several major ports on the American east coast. On 27 March 1898, she was ordered to Hampton Roads, Virginia, to join the Flying Squadron, under Commodore Winfield Scott Schley, for the blockade of Cuba.

=== Spanish–American War ===
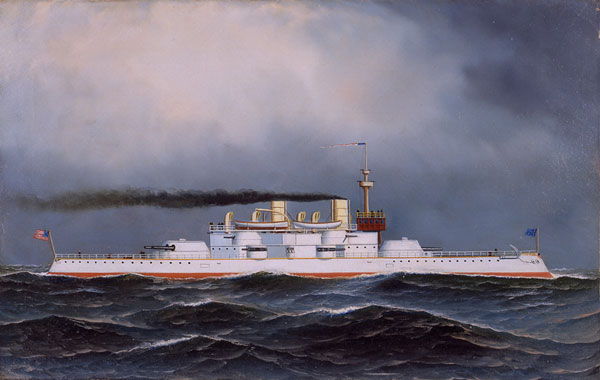
Painting of USS Massachusetts

After the outbreak of the Spanish–American War, the Flying Squadron steamed to Key West. There, Schley met with Rear Admiral Sampson, who had just returned from the bombardment of San Juan, Puerto Rico. They discussed the possible locations of the Spanish squadron, under Admiral Cervera, and Schley was sent to the harbor of Cienfuegos, Cuba, to look for Cervera. Schley arrived off Cienfuegos, on 22 May, and took several days to establish that Cervera's ships were not in the harbor. The squadron then proceeded to Santiago de Cuba, the only other port on the southern coast of Cuba that was large enough for the Spanish ships, arriving after several delays on 29 May. On arrival, the Spanish cruiser Cristóbal Colón, was visible from outside the harbor entrance, confirming that the Spanish fleet was in the harbor. Schley blockaded the harbor and informed Sampson, who arrived with his own squadron on 1 June, and assumed overall command.

During the next month Massachusetts took part in the blockade of Santiago de Cuba, occasionally bombarding the harbor forts. On the night of 2–3 July, she and the two cruisers New Orleans and Newark, left the blockade to load coal in Guantanamo Bay, Cuba. This caused her to miss the Battle of Santiago de Cuba, on 3 July, in which the Spanish fleet attempted to break through the blockade and was completely destroyed. The next day the battleship came back to Santiago de Cuba, where she and Texas fired at the disarmed Spanish cruiser Reina Mercedes, which was being scuttled by the Spanish, in an attempt to block the harbor entrance channel. Massachusetts was then sent to Puerto Rico, to support the American occupation until she steamed home to New York, on 1 August, arriving on 20 August.

=== Post Spanish–American War ===
After a quick overhaul in drydock, Massachusetts was attempting to leave New York Harbor on 10 December 1898, when she struck Diamond Reef, flooding five of her forward compartments. She was forced to return to the navy yard, where she was placed in drydock again for repairs which took around three months. For a year Massachusetts served with the North Atlantic Squadron, visiting various cities on the Atlantic coast. In May 1900, she and Indiana were placed in reserve as the navy had an acute officer shortage and needed to put the new Kearsarge-class and Illinois-class battleships into commission. The battleships were reactivated the following month as an experiment in how quickly this could be achieved, and Massachusetts returned to service with the North Atlantic Squadron.

In March 1901, the battleship grounded again, this time in the harbor of Pensacola, Florida, but the ship was able to continue her trip. A more serious accident occurred during target practice in January 1903, when an explosion in an 8-inch (203 mm) turret killed nine crew members. They were the first fatalities aboard a United States battleship since the sinking of Maine, in 1898. Another accident happened in August of that year, when Massachusetts grounded on a rock in Frenchman Bay, Maine. The ship was seriously damaged and had to be repaired in drydock. In December 1904, yet another lethal accident took place aboard Massachusetts: three men were killed and several others badly burned when a broken gasket caused steam to fill the boiler room. On 8 January 1906, the battleship was decommissioned and her crew was transferred to her sister ship Indiana, which had completed a three-year modernization. Massachusetts now received the same upgrades, including twelve 3-inch (76 mm)/50 caliber single-purpose guns to replace the 6-inch (152 mm) and most of the lighter guns, new Babcock & Wilcox boilers, counterweights to balance her main turrets, a lattice mast, and electric traversing mechanisms for her turrets.

On 2 May 1910, Massachusetts was placed in reduced commission so she could be used for the annual Naval Academy midshipmen summer cruise. Despite her modernizations the battleship was now regarded as "obsolete and worthless, even for the second line of defense" by Secretary of the Navy George von Lengerke Meyer. She saw little use, other than summer cruises, and was transferred to the Atlantic Reserve Fleet when it was formed in 1912. After a quick trip to New York for a Presidential Fleet Review in October 1912, the warship returned to Philadelphia and stayed there until she was decommissioned on 23 May 1914.

=== World War I and fate ===
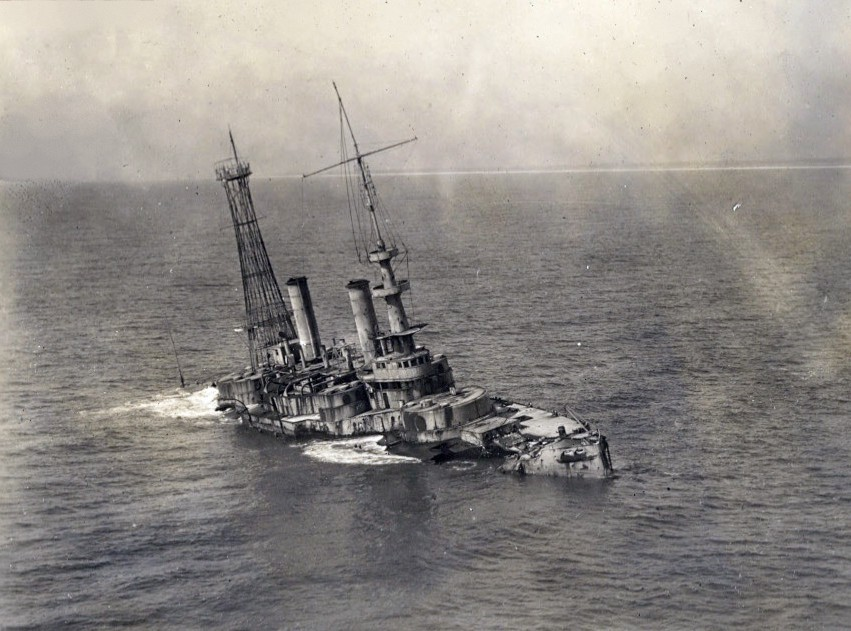
Massachusetts being scuttled off Pensacola, Florida

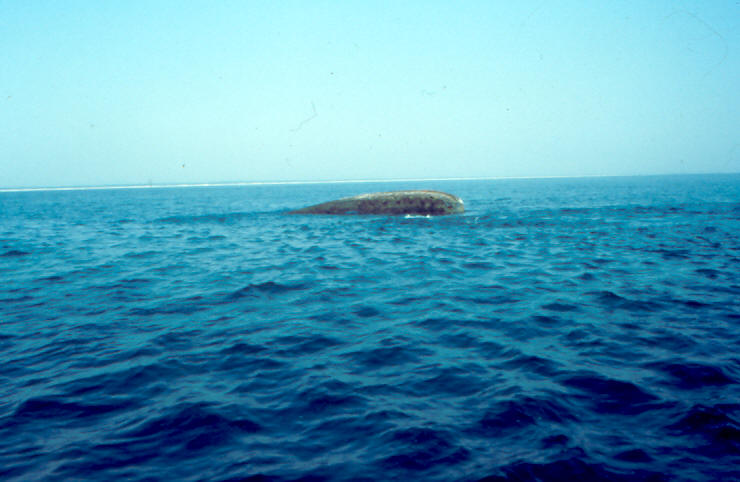
The wreck of Massachusetts off Pensacola, on 8 April 2002

After the United States entered World War I, Massachusetts was recommissioned for the final time, on 9 June 1917. She was used by Naval Reserve gun crews for gunnery training in Block Island Sound, until 27 May 1918. The battleship was then redeployed to serve as a heavy gun target practice ship near Chesapeake Bay, until the end of World War I. Massachusetts returned to Philadelphia, on 16 February 1919. She was decommissioned for the final time on 31 March 1919, after being re-designated "Coast Battleship Number 2" two days earlier so her name could be reused for the first South Dakota-class dreadnought battleship Massachusetts (BB-54).

Massachusetts was struck from the Naval Vessel Register on 22 November 1920, and loaned to the United States Department of War, then used as a target ship for experimental artillery. When the US Navy adopted hull numbers that year, Massachusetts was retroactively assigned the number "BB-2". She was scuttled in shallow water in the Gulf of Mexico, off Pensacola, on 6 January 1921, and bombarded by the coastal batteries of Fort Pickens and by railway artillery. On 20 February 1925, the Department of War returned her wreck to the US Navy, which offered her for scrap, but no acceptable bids were received.

Eventually Massachusetts was declared the property of the State of Florida, by the Supreme Court of Florida. On 10 June 1993—the centennial anniversary of her launching—the site became the fourth Florida Underwater Archaeological Preserve. In 2001, the wreck also was added to the National Register of Historic Places, and it still serves as an artificial reef and diving spot.
