= USS Indiana (BB-1) =

Battleship of the United States Navy

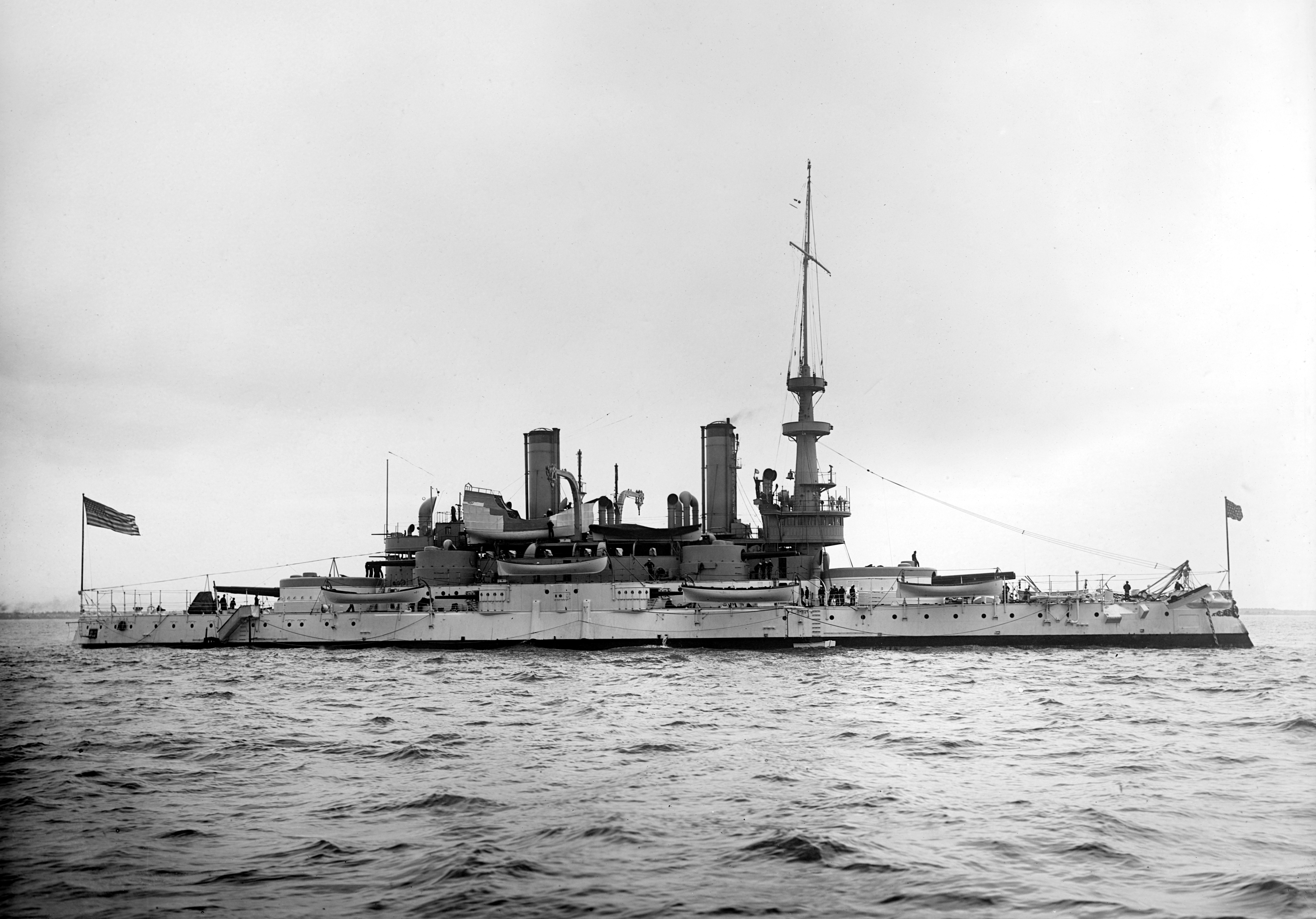
- USS Indiana in the early 20th century

History

United States
- Name: Indiana
- Namesake: Indiana
- Ordered: 30 June 1890
- Builder: William Cramp & Sons, Philadelphia, Pennsylvania
- Laid down: 7 May 1891
- Launched: 28 February 1893
- Commissioned: 20 November 1895
- Decommissioned: 24 December 1903
- Recommissioned: 9 January 1906
- Decommissioned: 23 May 1914
- Recommissioned: 24 May 1917
- Decommissioned: 31 January 1919
- Renamed: Coast Battleship Number 1 on 29 March 1919
- Fate: Sunk as target on 1 November 1920; Sold for scrapping 19 March 1924

General characteristics
- Class & type: Indiana-class pre-dreadnought battleship
- Displacement: 10,288 long tons (10,453 t) (standard)
- Length: 350 ft 11 in (106.96 m) (overall); 358 ft (109 m) (waterline)
- Beam: 69 ft 3 in (21.11 m) (wl)
- Draft: 27 ft (8.2 m)
- Installed power: 4 × Scotch boilers
- Propulsion: 2 sets triple-expansion steam engines; 2 × screws
- Speed: 15 knots (28 km/h; 17 mph)
- Range: 4,900 nmi (9,100 km; 5,600 mi) (Note: Experimental data for Indiana and Massachusetts were lumped together, and the rounded average was calculated. See Bryan 1901.)
- Complement: 32 officers; 441 men
- Armament: 2 × twin 13 in (330 mm)/35 caliber guns; 4 × twin 8 in (203 mm)/35 cal guns; 4 × 6 in (152 mm)/40 cal guns; 20 × 6-pounder 57 mm (2.2 in) guns; 6 × 1-pounder 37 mm (1.5 in) guns; 4 × 18 in (457 mm) torpedo tubes (Note: Sources conflict on this. Reilly & Scheina 1980 claim six on p. 56, then four on p. 68. Friedman 1985 claims the contract called for seven tubes, but Indiana was completed with four.)
- Armor: Belt: 18–8.5 in (457–216 mm); 13" turrets: 15 in (381 mm); Hull: 5 in (127 mm); 8" turrets: 6 in (152 mm); Conning Tower: 10 in (254 mm); Deck: 3 in (76 mm)

General characteristics (Later refits)
- Installed power: 8 × Babcock & Wilcox boilers (1905); 9,000 ihp (6.7 MW)
- Armament: 4 × 6 in/40 cal guns removed (1908); 12 × 3 in (76 mm)/50 cal guns added (1910)

USS Indiana was the lead ship of her class and the first battleship in the United States Navy comparable to foreign battleships of the time. Authorized in 1890 and commissioned five years later, she was a small battleship, though with heavy armor and ordnance. The ship also pioneered the use of an intermediate battery. She was designed for coastal defense and as a result, her decks were not safe from high waves on the open ocean.

Indiana served in the Spanish–American War (1898) as part of the North Atlantic Squadron. She took part in both the blockade of Santiago de Cuba and the Battle of Santiago de Cuba, which occurred when the Spanish fleet attempted to break through the blockade. Although unable to join the chase of the escaping Spanish cruisers, she was partly responsible for the destruction of the Spanish destroyers Plutón and Furor. After the war, she quickly became obsolete—despite several modernizations—and spent most of her time in commission as a training ship or in the reserve fleet, with her last commission during World War I as a training ship for gun crews. She was decommissioned for the third and final time in January 1919 and was shortly after reclassified Coast Battleship Number 1 so that the name Indiana could be reused. She was sunk in shallow water as a target in aerial bombing tests in 1920, and her hull was sold for scrap in 1924.

== Design ==
Indiana was constructed from a modified version of a design drawn up by a US Navy policy board in 1889 for a short-range battleship. The original design was part of an ambitious naval construction plan to build 33 battleships and 167 smaller ships. The United States Congress saw the plan as an attempt to end the U.S. policy of isolationism and did not approve it, but a year later, the United States House of Representatives approved funding for three coast defense battleships, which would become Indiana and her sister ships Massachusetts and Oregon. The "coast defense" designation was reflected in Indiana's moderate endurance, relatively small displacement and low freeboard, which limited seagoing capability. The ships proved to be disappointments in service, as they were badly overweight upon completion, their low freeboard hampered operations at sea, and they handled poorly. Conway's All the World's Fighting Ships describes her design as "attempting too much on a very limited displacement." They were nevertheless the first modern battleships for the American fleet.

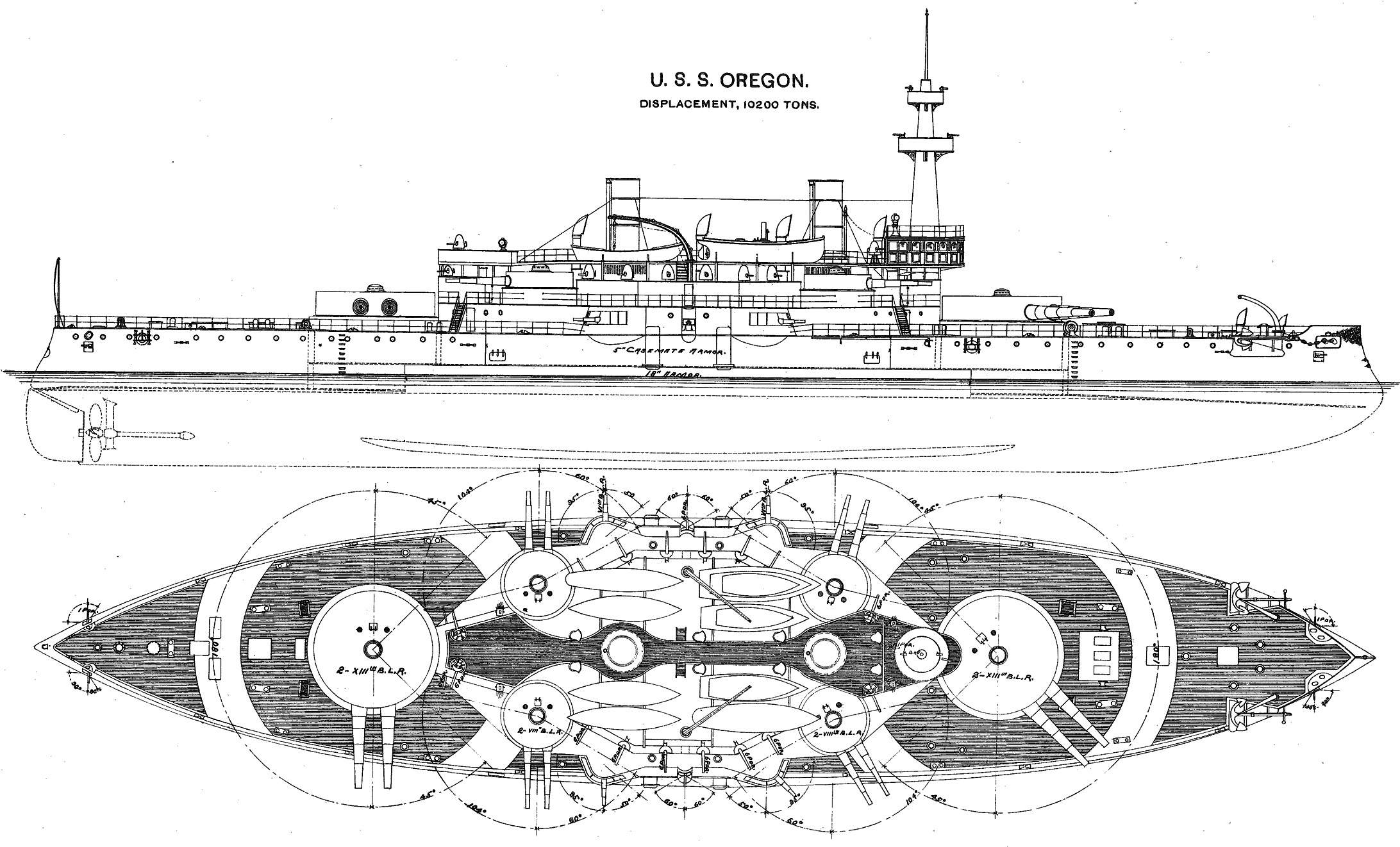
Plan and profile illustration of Oregon, one of the Indiana-class battleships

Indiana was 351 feet 2 inches (107.04 m) long overall and had a beam of 69 ft 3 in (21.11 m) and a draft of 24 ft (7.3 m). She displaced 10,288 long tons (10,453 t) as designed and up to 11,688 long tons (11,876 t) at full load. The ship was powered by two-shaft triple-expansion steam engines rated at 9,000 indicated horsepower (6,700 kW) and four coal-fired fire-tube boilers, generating a top speed of 15 knots (28 km/h; 17 mph). She had a cruising radius of 5,640 nautical miles (10,450 km; 6,490 mi) at a speed of 10 knots (19 km/h; 12 mph). As built, she was fitted with a heavy military mast, which was later supplemented by a stern cage mast in 1910–1911. She had a crew of 32 officers and 441 enlisted men, which increased to a total of 586–636 officers and enlisted.

The ship was armed with a main battery of four 13 in (330 mm) /35 caliber guns in two twin gun turrets on the centerline, one forward and aft. The secondary battery consisted of eight 8-inch (203 mm) /35 cal. guns, which were placed in four twin wing turrets. These were supported by a battery of six 6 in (150 mm) /40 cal. guns in a casemate battery amidships. For close-range defense against torpedo boats, she carried twenty 6-pounder guns and six 1-pounder guns in individual mounts. As was standard for capital ships of the period, Indiana carried 18 in (457 mm) torpedo tubes in above-water mounts, though the number is unclear. According to Conway's, she was fitted with six tubes, though the naval historian Norman Friedman states she was ordered with seven but completed with five.

Indiana's main armored belt was 18 in (457 mm) thick over the magazines and the machinery spaces and was reduced to 4 in (102 mm) at the bow and stern. The main battery gun turrets had 17-inch (432 mm) thick sides, and the supporting barbettes had the same thickness of armor plate on their exposed sides. The 8 in turrets had 6 in of armor plating, and the casemate battery had 5 in (127 mm). The conning tower had 10 in (254 mm) thick sides.

== Service history ==
=== Construction and early career ===
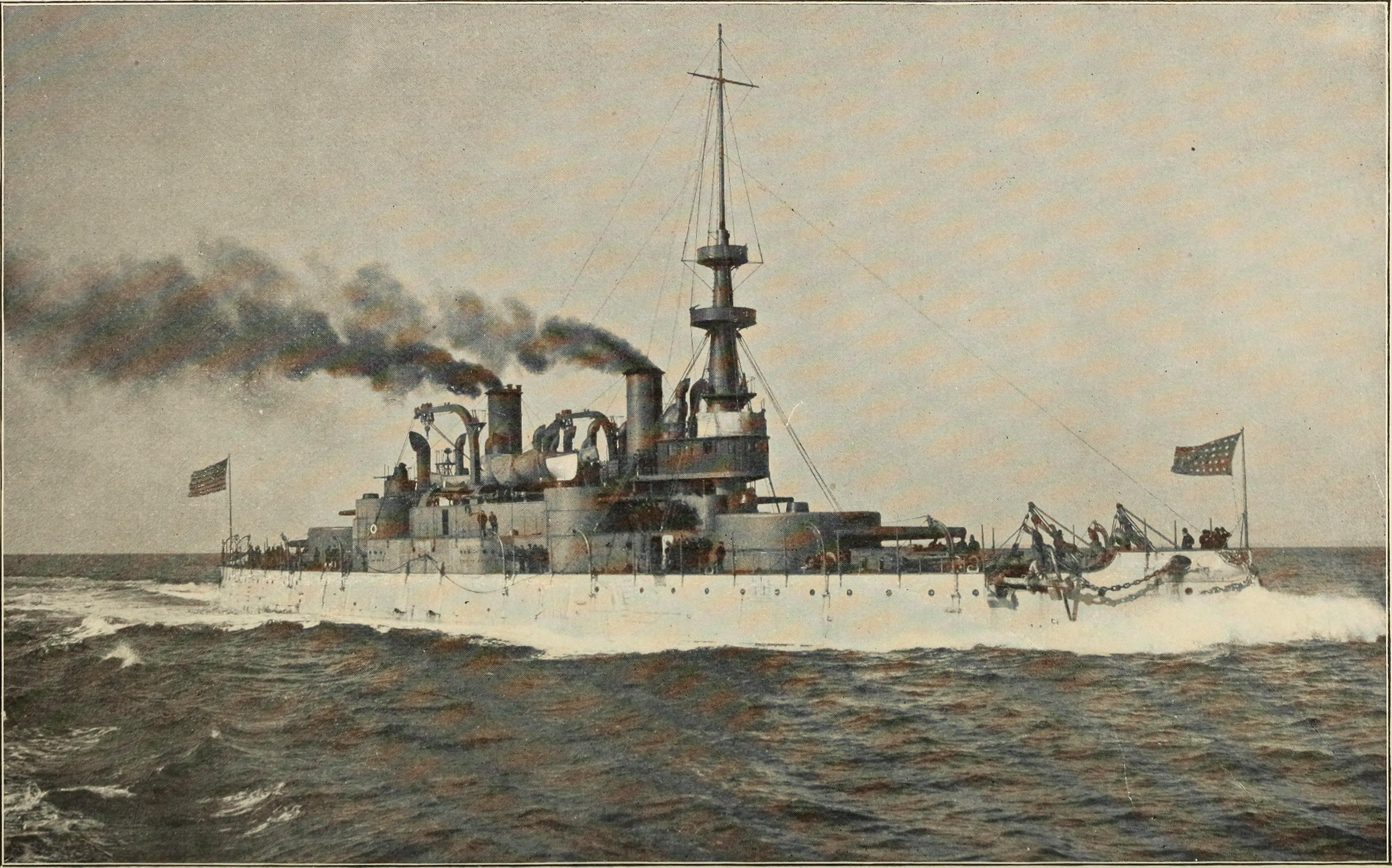
Indiana early in her career

Construction of the ships was authorized on 30 June 1890, and the contract for Indiana—not including guns and armor—was awarded to William Cramp & Sons in Philadelphia, who offered to build it for $3,020,000. The ship's total cost was almost twice as high, approximately $6,000,000. The contract specified the ship had to be built in three years, but slow delivery of armor plates caused a two-year delay. Indiana's keel was laid down on 7 May 1891 and she was launched on 28 February 1893, attended by around 10,000 people, including President Benjamin Harrison, several members of his cabinet and the two senators from Indiana. During her fitting-out in early March 1894, the ship undertook a preliminary sea trial to test her speed and machinery. At this point, her side armor, guns, turrets, and conning tower had not yet been fitted, and her official trials would not take place until October 1895 due to the delays in armor deliveries.

Indiana was commissioned on 20 November 1895 under the command of Captain Robley D. Evans. After further trials, the ship joined the North Atlantic Squadron under the command of Rear Admiral Francis M. Bunce, which conducted training exercises along the East Coast of the United States. In late 1896, both main turrets broke loose from their clamps in heavy seas. Because the turrets were not centrally balanced, they swung from side to side with the ship's motion, until they were secured with heavy ropes. Heavier clamps were installed, but in February 1896, while conducting fleet maneuvers with the North Atlantic squadron, the Indiana encountered more bad weather and started rolling heavily. Her new captain, Henry Clay Taylor, promptly ordered her back to port for fear the clamps would break again. This convinced the navy that bilge keels—omitted during construction because, with them, the ship could not fit in most American dry docks—were necessary to reduce the rolling, and they were installed on all three ships of the Indiana-class.

=== Spanish–American War ===
Painting of Indiana during the battle of Santiago

At the outbreak of the Spanish–American War in April 1898, Indiana was at Key West with the rest of the North Atlantic Squadron, at the time commanded by Rear Admiral William T. Sampson. His squadron was ordered to the Spanish port of San Juan in an attempt to intercept and destroy Admiral Cervera's Spanish squadron, which was en route to the Caribbean from Spain. The harbor was empty, but Indiana and the rest of the squadron bombarded it for two hours on 12 May 1898 before realizing their mistake. The squadron returned to Key West, where news arrived three weeks later that Commodore Schley's Flying Squadron had found Cervera and was now blockading him in the port of Santiago de Cuba. Sampson reinforced Schley on 1 June and assumed overall command.

In an attempt to break the stalemate, it was decided to attack Santiago from land. A transport convoy was assembled in Key West, and Indiana was sent back to lead it. The expeditionary force, under the command of Major General William Rufus Shafter, landed east of the city and attacked it on 1 July. Cervera saw that his situation was desperate and attempted to break through the blockade on 3 July 1898, resulting in the battle of Santiago de Cuba. The cruisers New Orleans and Newark and battleship Massachusetts had left the day before to load coal in Guantanamo Bay. Admiral Sampson's flagship, the cruiser New York, had also sailed east earlier that morning for a meeting with General Shafter, leaving Commodore Schley in command. This left the blockade weakened and unbalanced on the day of the battle, as three modern battleships (Indiana, Oregon and Iowa) and the armed yacht Gloucester guarded the east, while the west was only defended by the second-class battleship Texas, cruiser Brooklyn and armed yacht Vixen.

Occupying the extreme eastern position of the blockade, Indiana fired at the cruisers Infanta María Teresa and Almirante Oquendo as they left the harbor, but, due to engine problems, was unable to keep up with the Spanish cruisers as they fled to the west. When the Spanish destroyers Plutón and Furor emerged, Indiana was near the harbor entrance and, together with Iowa, she supported the armed yacht Gloucester in the destruction of the lightly armored enemy ships. She was then ordered to keep up the blockade of the harbor in case more Spanish ships came out and so played no role in the chase and sinking of the two remaining Spanish cruisers, Vizcaya and Cristóbal Colón.

=== Post Spanish–American War ===
After the war, Indiana returned to training exercises with the North Atlantic Squadron. In May 1900, she and Massachusetts were placed in reserve as the navy had an acute officer shortage and needed to put the new Kearsarge-class and Illinois-class battleship into commission. The battleships were reactivated the following month as an experiment in how quickly this could be achieved, but Indiana was placed in the reserve fleet again that winter. In March 1901, it was decided to use her that summer for a midshipman practice cruise, and this would be her regular summer job for the next few years, while the rest of the time she would serve as a training ship. During her time as a training vessel, her crew beat the 1903 world record with eight-inch guns, four bullseyes with four shots. She was decommissioned on 29 December 1903 to be overhauled and modernized. The obsolete battleship received several upgrades: new Babcock & Wilcox boilers, counterweights to balance her main turrets, and electric traversing mechanisms for her turrets. She was recommissioned on 9 January 1906 and manned by the former crew of her sister ship Massachusetts, including Captain Edward D. Taussig, commanding. Massachusetts had been decommissioned the day before to receive similar modernization.

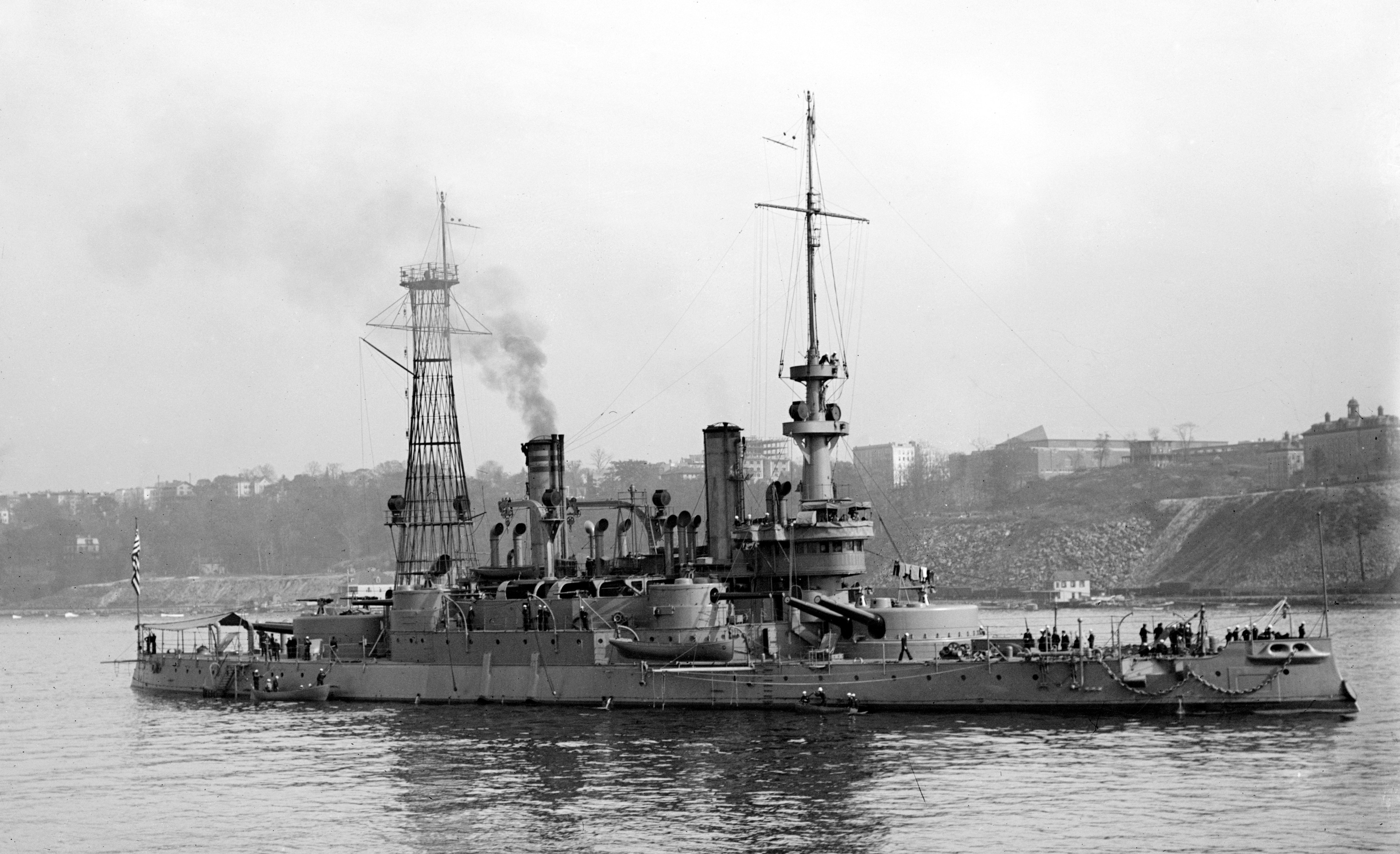
Indiana in the early 1910s

During her second commission, Indiana spent most of her time laid up in the reserve fleet, occasionally participating in practice cruises. In January 1907, she helped provide relief in the aftermath of the 1907 Kingston earthquake. In 1908, the 6-inch (152 mm)/40 caliber guns and most of the lighter guns were removed to compensate for the counterweights added to the main battery turrets and because the ammunition supply for the guns was considered problematic. A year later, twelve 3-inch (76 mm)/50 caliber single-purpose guns were added midships and in the fighting tops. At the same time, a cage mast was added. In early 1910, she was fitted with an experimental Lacoste speed brake, which would be deployed from the side of the hull to act as an emergency brake; the trials were inconclusive. By 1913 it was speculated that the ship might soon be used for target practice, but instead, the ship was decommissioned on 23 May 1914. After the United States entered World War I, Indiana was commissioned for the third time and served as a training ship for gun crews near Tompkinsville, Staten Island, and in the York River, and placed under the command of George Landenberger.

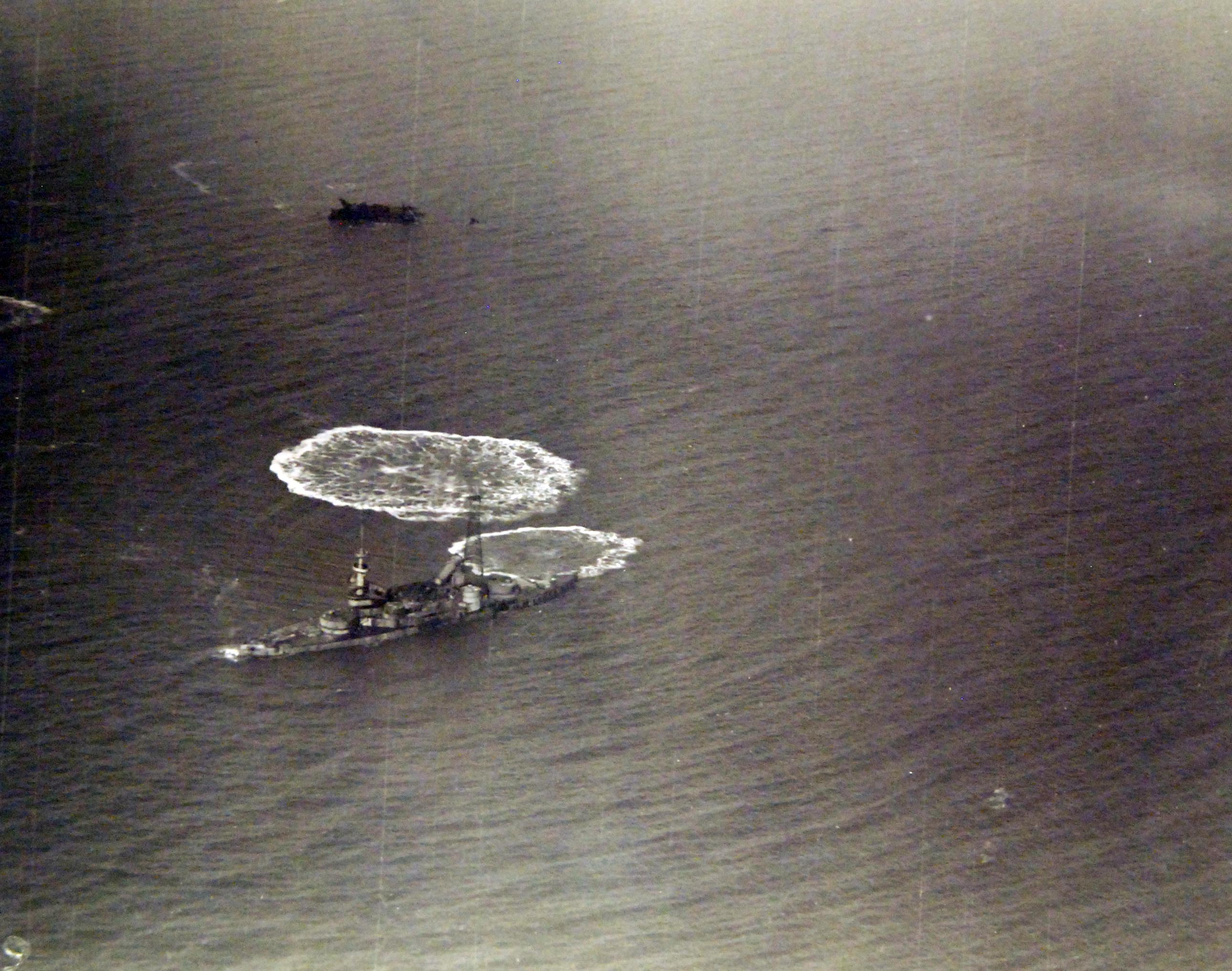
Aerial view of the damaged Indiana following aerial bombing tests, 21 April 1921

On 31 January 1919, she was decommissioned for the final time, and two months later, she was renamed Coast Battleship Number 1 so that the name Indiana could be assigned to the newly authorized—but never completed—battleship Indiana (BB-50). The old battleship was brought to shallow waters in the Chesapeake Bay near the wreck of the target ship San Marcos (ex-Battleship Texas). Here she was subjected to aerial bombing tests conducted by the navy. She was hit with dummy bombs from aircraft, and explosive charges were set off at the positions where the bombs hit. The tests were a response to claims from Billy Mitchell—at the time assistant to Chief of Air Service Charles T. Menoher—who stated to Congress that the Air Service could sink any battleship. The conclusions drawn by the navy from the experiments conducted on Indiana were very different, as Captain William D. Leahy stated in his report: "The entire experiment pointed to the improbability of a modern battleship being either destroyed or completely put out of action by aerial bombs." The subject remained a matter of dispute between Mitchell and the Navy, and several more bombing tests were conducted with other decommissioned battleships, culminating in the sinking of SMS Ostfriesland. Despite the navy's conclusions, Indiana sank during the test and settled in the shallow water, where she remained until her wreck was sold for scrap on 19 March 1924. When the US Navy adopted hull numbers in 1920, Indiana was retroactively assigned the number "BB-1".

== Sources cited ==
=== Books ===
- Campbell, N. J. M. (1979). "United States of America". In Chesneau, Roger & Kolesnik, Eugene M. (eds.). Conway's All the World's Fighting Ships 1860–1905. Greenwich: Conway Maritime Press. pp. 114–169. ISBN 978-0-85177-133-5.
- Friedman, Norman (1985). U.S. Battleships, An Illustrated Design History. Annapolis, Maryland: Naval Institute Press. ISBN 978-0870217159.
- Gardiner, Robert & Lambert, Andrew D. (1992). Steam, Steel & Shellfire: The Steam Warship 1815–1905. London: Conway Maritime Press. ISBN 978-0851775647.
- Graham, George E. & Schley, Winfield S. (1902). Schley and Santiago: An Historical Account of the Blockade and Final Destruction of the Spanish Fleet Under Command of Admiral Pasquale Cervera, July 3, 1898. Texas: W.B. Conkey Company. OCLC 1866852.
- Hale, John Richard (1911). Famous Sea Fights, From Salamis to Tsu-Shima. Boston: Little, Brown, & Company.
- Reilly, John C. & Scheina, Robert L. (1980). American Battleships 1886–1923: Predreadnought Design and Construction. London: Arms and Armour Press. ISBN 978-0853684466.
- Tucker, Spencer (2013). Almanac of American Military History. Vol. I. Santa Barbara: ABC-CLIO. ISBN 978-1598845303.

=== Newspapers ===
- "The new American navy; Secretary Tracy reports in favor of progress" (PDF). The New York Times. 1 December 1890.
- "Cramps claim of $1,367,244; House spends entire day on bill to refer it to the Court of Claims" (PDF). The New York Times. 19 January 1901.
- "Cramps lose $135,000 claim; asserted delay in building the Indiana cost them that" (PDF). The New York Times. 14 May 1907.
- "The war steamer Indiana; to be launched from the Cramp yards today" (PDF). The New York Times. 27 February 1893.
- "Launch of the Indiana; The big war ship glides into the water safely" (PDF). The New York Times. 28 February 1893.
- "Battle ship Indiana on trial; Builders preliminary test of her speed and machinery" (PDF). The New York Times. 7 March 1894.
- "Indiana makes a fast run; six-tenths of a knot better than required speed. Her preliminary trial most successful" (PDF). The New York Times. 9 March 1894.
- "The Indiana a wonder; Highly successful speed test of the new battleship" (PDF). The New York Times. 19 October 1895.
- "Cramps wants money due on cruisers" (PDF). The New York Times. 20 September 1894.
- "The Indiana is Accepted; Capt. Evans Placed in Command – The Boston Goes to China" (PDF). The New York Times. 19 November 1895.
- "The North Atlantic Squadron; Programme of the Evolutions It Will Make This Summer" (PDF). The New York Times. 18 June 1896.
- "Defects in the Indiana; Her Turrets Got Loose Again on the Trip with Admiral Bunce's Squadron" (PDF). The New York Times. 5 February 1897.
- "Where Our Warships Are; The Positions of the Vessels of the Navy According to the Latest Reports" (PDF). The New York Times. 1 April 1898.
- "The Santiago Off; Gen. Shafter's Command Leaves Key West for Cuba, Convoyed by a Powerful Fleet" (PDF). The New York Times. 12 June 1898.
- "The Indiana at Santiago; Admiral Sampson Assures Capt. Taylor that He Meant No Criticism in His Report" (PDF). The New York Times. 26 August 1898.
- "Sampson's Story of the Battle; Official Report of the Destruction of Cervera's Squadron" (PDF). The New York Times. 26 July 1898.
- "Navy Short of Officers; There Are Not Enough to Keep Warships in Commission" (PDF). The New York Times. 14 April 1900.
- "Hurry Order to the Navy; Department Wants to Find Out What Can Be Done in an Emergency" (PDF). The New York Times. 6 June 1900.
- "Warships to Be Laid Up" (PDF). The New York Times. 20 August 1900.
- "Battleship Assigned to Cadets" (PDF). The New York Times. 26 March 1901.
- "More Men for the Navy; Plan to Increase the Force of Seamen to 50,000" (PDF). The New York Times. 8 April 1902.
- "Battleship Indiana's Overhauling" (PDF). The New York Times. 19 November 1903.
- "Reconstructed Indiana ready" (PDF). The New York Times. 8 January 1906.
- "Plans Completed for Naval Review; Maritime Pageant Will Surpass Anything of the Kind Seen in American Waters" (PDF). The New York Times. 10 November 1907.
- "Battleship for the Middies; Three Assigned to Them for Next Summer's Cruise" (PDF). The New York Times. 27 November 1909.
- "Old Battleships to Become Targets; Indiana Expected to be the Next to be Riddled by the Atlantic Fleet" (PDF). The New York Times. 31 March 1913.
- "G. B. Landenberger, Navy Captain, Dies: Retired Officer Served for 35 – Held Many Important Posts During Career". The New York Times. 16 January 1936. p. 21.

=== Other ===
- Bryan, B. C. (1901). "The Steaming Radius of United States Naval Vessels". Journal of the American Society for Naval Engineers. 13 (1): 50–69. doi:10.1111/j.1559-3584.1901.tb03372.x. (subscription required)
- Correll, John T (June 2008). "Billy Mitchell and the Battleships". Air Force Magazine. 91 (6). Archived from the original on 21 April 2021.
- "Indiana I (Battleship No.1): 1895-1919". Dictionary of American Naval Fighting Ships. Navy Department, Naval History and Heritage Command.
- "The Speed Trial of the United States Battleship Massachusetts". Scientific American. 74: 297. 9 May 1896.
- Smith, Wm. Strother (18 March 2009) [February 1916]. "Results of Model-Tank Experiments to Determine the Action of a Ship Brake". Journal of the American Society for Naval Engineers. 28 (1): 303–308. doi:10.1111/j.1559-3584.1916.tb00630.x.
- "Williamson (Destroyer No. 244)". Dictionary of American Naval Fighting Ships. Navy Department, Naval History & Heritage Command.
