= Indiana-class battleship =

Pre-dreadnought battleship class of the United States Navy

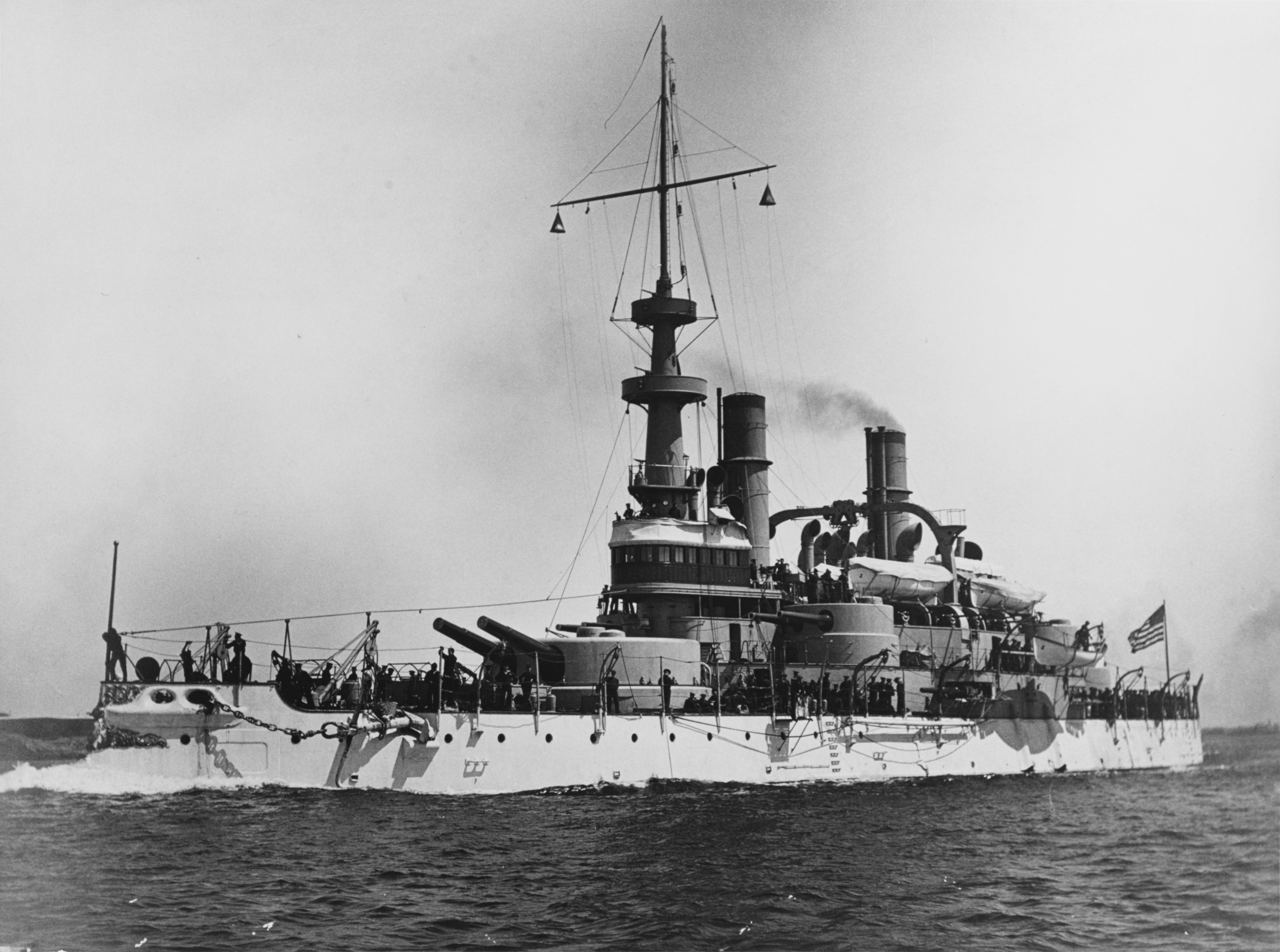
- USS Indiana – the lead ship of the class

Class overview
- Builders: William Cramp & Sons (Indiana and Massachusetts); Union Iron Works (Oregon)
- Operators: United States Navy
- Preceded by: USS Texas
- Succeeded by: USS Iowa
- Cost: $6,000,000 Indiana (BB-1) and; Massachusetts (BB-2); $6,500,000 Oregon (BB-3)
- In commission: 20 November 1895 – 4 October 1919
- Planned: 3
- Completed: 3
- Retired: 3
- Preserved: 0

General characteristics
- Type: Pre-dreadnought battleship
- Displacement: 10,288 long tons (10,453 t; 11,523 short tons) (standard)
- Length: 350 ft 11 in (106.96 m) (overall); 358 ft (109 m) (waterline)
- Beam: 69 ft 3 in (21.11 m) (wl)
- Draft: 27 ft (8.2 m)
- Installed power: 4 × double ended Scotch boilers later replaced by 8 × Babcock & Wilcox boilers; 9,000 ihp (6.7 MW) (design); 9,700–11,000 ihp (7.2–8.2 MW) (trial)
- Propulsion: 2 sets vertical inverted triple expansion reciprocating steam engines; 2 × screws
- Speed: 15 kn (28 km/h; 17 mph) (design); 15.6–16.8 kn (28.9–31.1 km/h; 18.0–19.3 mph) (trial)
- Range: 4,900 nmi (9,100 km; 5,600 mi) (BB-1 & 2) (Note: Rounded average calculated from the experimental data in this paper, with BB-1 and BB-2 lumped together. See Bryan 1901.); 5,600 nmi (10,400 km; 6,400 mi) (BB-3)
- Complement: 32 officers 441 men
- Armament: 4 × 13 in (330 mm)/35 caliber guns (2x2); 8 × 8 in (203 mm)/35 cal guns (4x2); 4 × 6 in (152 mm)/40 cal guns; 20 × 6-pounder 57 mm (2.2 in) guns; 6 × 1-pounder 37 mm (1.5 in) guns; 6 × 18 inch (450 mm) torpedo tubes (Note: Sources conflict on this. Reilly & Scheina 1980 claim six on p. 56, then four on p. 68. They also claim on Massachusetts and Oregon one broadside tube was left out to provide additional space, leaving them with three or five tubes. DANFS claims six tubes on the latter two and no information is given on Indiana. Friedman 1985 claims the contract called for seven tubes, but two of the ships were completed with five, and only four on Indiana.)
- Armor: Harvey and NS; Belt: 4–18 in (102–457 mm); Turrets (main): 15 in (381 mm); Barbettes (main): 17 in (432 mm); Turrets (secondary): 5–8 in (127–203 mm); Barbettes (secondary): 8-in; Conning tower: 9 in (229 mm)

The Indiana class was a class of three pre-dreadnought battleships launched in 1893. These were the first battleships built by the United States Navy comparable to contemporary European ships, such as the British HMS Hood. Authorized in 1890 and commissioned between November 1895 and April 1896, these were relatively small battleships with heavy armor and ordnance that pioneered the use of an intermediate battery. Specifically intended for coastal defense, their freeboard was insufficient to deal well with the waves of the open ocean. The turrets lacked counterweights, and the main belt armor was placed too low to be effective under most conditions.

The ships were named Indiana, Massachusetts, and Oregon and were designated Battleship Number 1 through 3. All three served in the Spanish–American War, although Oregon—which was stationed on the West Coast—had to cruise 14,000 nautical miles (26,000 km; 16,000 mi) around South America to the East Coast first. After the war, Oregon returned to the Pacific and participated in the Philippine–American War and the suppression of the Boxer Rebellion, while her sister ships were restricted to training missions in the Atlantic Ocean. After 1903, the obsolete battleships were decommissioned and recommissioned several times, the last time during World War I when Indiana and Massachusetts served as training ships, while Oregon was a transport escort for the Siberian Intervention.

In 1919, all three ships were decommissioned for the final time. Indiana was sunk in shallow water as an explosives test target a year later and sold for scrap in 1924. Massachusetts was scuttled off the coast of Pensacola in 1920 and used as an artillery target. The wreck was never scrapped and is now a Florida Underwater Archaeological Preserve. Oregon was initially preserved as a museum, but was sold for scrap during World War II. The scrapping was later halted and the stripped hulk was used as an ammunition barge during the battle of Guam. The hulk was finally sold for scrap in 1956.

== Background ==
The Indiana class was very controversial at the time of its approval by the United States Congress. A policy board convened by the Secretary of the Navy Benjamin F. Tracy came up with an ambitious 15-year naval construction program on 16 July 1889, three years after the Maine and the Texas were authorized. The battleships in their plan would include ten first-rate long-range battleships with a 17 knots (31 km/h; 20 mph) top speed and a steaming radius of 5,400 nmi (10,000 km; 6,200 mi) at 10 kn (19 km/h; 12 mph)—6,500 nmi (12,000 km; 7,500 mi) maximum. These ocean-going ships were envisioned as a possible fleet in being, a fleet capable of raiding an enemy's home ports and intended to deter powerful warships from ranging too far from home. Twenty-five short-range second-rate battleships would provide home defense in both the Atlantic and Pacific and support the faster and larger long-range vessels. With a range of roughly 2,700 nmi (5,000 km; 3,100 mi) at 10 knots and a draft of 23.5 ft (7.2 m), they would roam from the St. Lawrence River in the north to the Windward Islands and Panama in the south and would be able to enter all the ports in the southern United States.

It was proposed, probably for cost reasons, that the short-range battleships should have a hierarchy of three subclasses. The first would mount four 13-inch (330 mm) guns each on eight 8,000-long-ton (8,100 t; 9,000-short-ton) ships, the second would mount four 12-inch (305 mm) guns each on ten 7,150-long-ton (7,260 t; 8,010-short-ton) ships, and the third would mount two 12-inch and two 10-inch (254 mm) guns each on five 6,000-long-ton (6,100 t; 6,700-short-ton) ships. The two battleships already under construction, Texas and Maine, were to be grouped under the last class. In addition, 167 smaller ships, including rams, cruisers and torpedo boats, would be built, coming to a total cost of $281.55 million, approximately equal to the sum of the entire US Navy budget during the previous 15 years (adjusted for inflation, $6.6 billion in 2009 dollars).

Congress balked at the plan, seeing in it an end to the United States policy of isolationism and the beginning of imperialism. Even some supporters of naval expansion were wary; Senator Eugene Hale feared that because the proposal was so large, the entire bill would be shot down and no money appropriated for any ships. However, in April 1890, the United States House of Representatives approved funding for three 8,000-long ton battleships. Tracy, trying to soothe tensions within Congress, remarked that these ships were so powerful only twelve would be necessary instead of the 35 called for in the original plan. He also slashed the operating costs of the Navy by giving the remaining Civil War-era monitors—which were utterly obsolete by this time—to navy militias operated by the states. The appropriation was also approved by the Senate, and in total three coast-defense battleships (the Indiana class), a cruiser, and a torpedo boat were given official approval and funding on 30 June 1890.

The first class of short-range ships as envisioned by the policy board were to mount 13-inch/35 caliber and new 5-inch (127 mm) guns, with 17 in (432 mm) of belt armor, 2.75 in (70 mm) of deck armor and 4 in (102 mm) of armor over the casemates. The Indiana class, as actually built, exceeded the design in displacement by 25 percent, but most other aspects were relatively similar to the original plan. An 18-inch (457 mm) belt and a secondary battery of 8-inch (203 mm) and 6-inch (152 mm) guns were adopted, the latter because the Bureau of Ordnance did not have the capability to construct rapid-firing 5-inch weaponry. The larger weapons were much slower firing and much heavier, but without the bigger guns, the ships would not be able to penetrate the armor of foreign battleships.

== Design ==
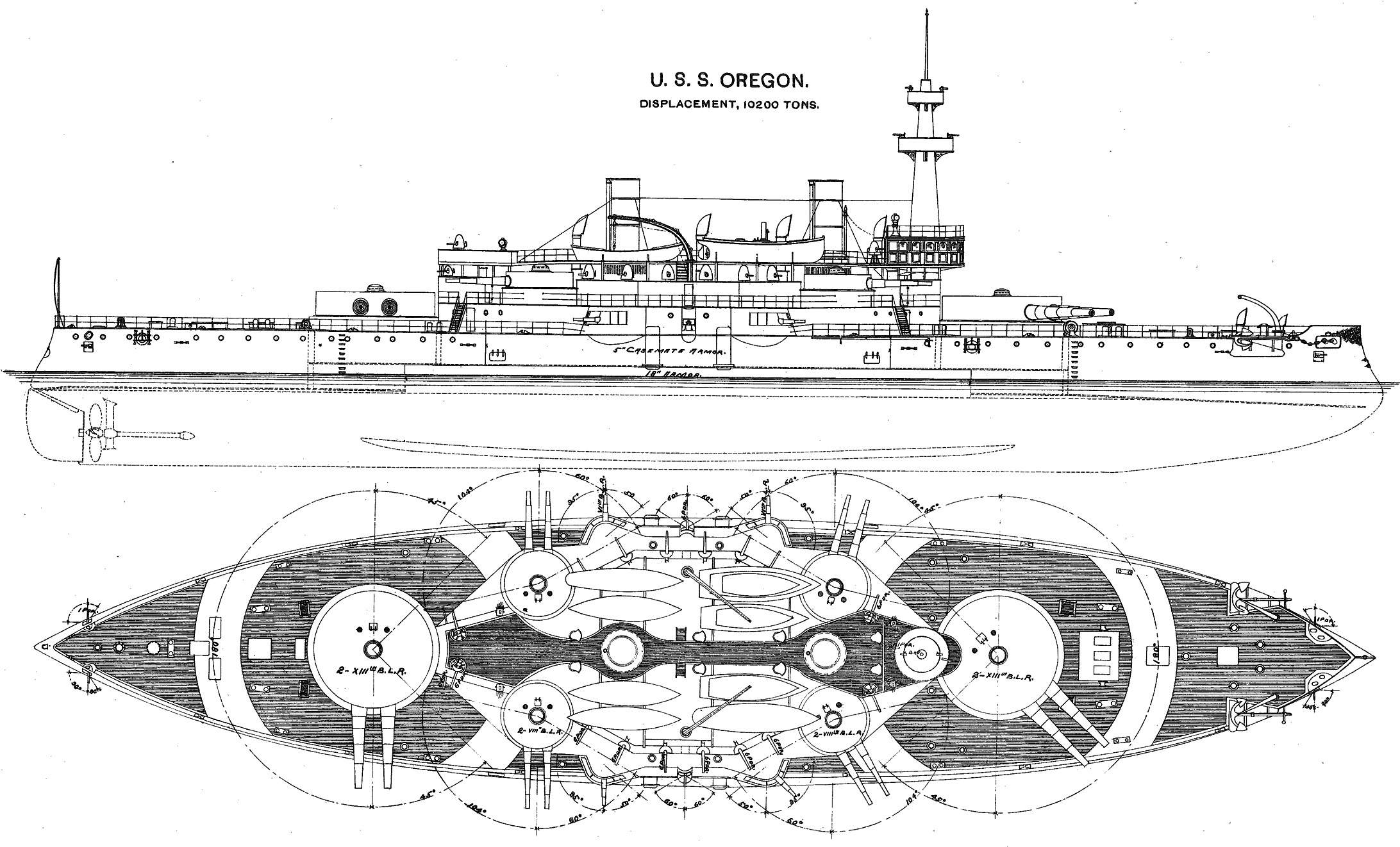
Outboard profile of Oregon, with position and arc of fire of the armament

=== General characteristics ===
The Indiana-class ships were designed specifically for coastal defense and were not intended for offensive actions. This design view was reflected in their moderate coal endurance, relatively small displacement and low freeboard, which limited seagoing capability. However, they were heavily armed and armored, so much in fact that Conway's All the World's Fighting Ships describes them as "attempting too much on a very limited displacement." They resembled the British battleship HMS Hood, but were 60 ft (18 m) shorter and featured an intermediate battery consisting of eight 8-inch guns not found in European ships, giving them a very respectable amount of firepower for their time.

The original design of the Indiana class included bilge keels, but with keels they would not fit in any of the American drydocks at the time, so they were omitted during construction. This meant a reduction in stability and caused a serious problem for Indiana, when both main turrets broke loose from their clamps in heavy seas a year after being commissioned. Because the turrets were not centrally balanced, they swung from side to side with the motion of the ship, until they were secured with heavy ropes. When the ship encountered more bad weather four months later, she promptly steamed back to port for fear the clamps would break again. This convinced the navy that bilge keels were necessary and they were subsequently installed on all three ships.

=== Armament ===
Given their limited displacement, the Indiana class had formidable armament for the time: four 13-inch guns, an intermediate battery of eight 8-inch guns and a secondary battery of four 6-inch guns, twenty Hotchkiss 6-pounders, and six Maxim-Nordenfelt 1-pounders, as well as six 18 inch (450 mm) tubes.

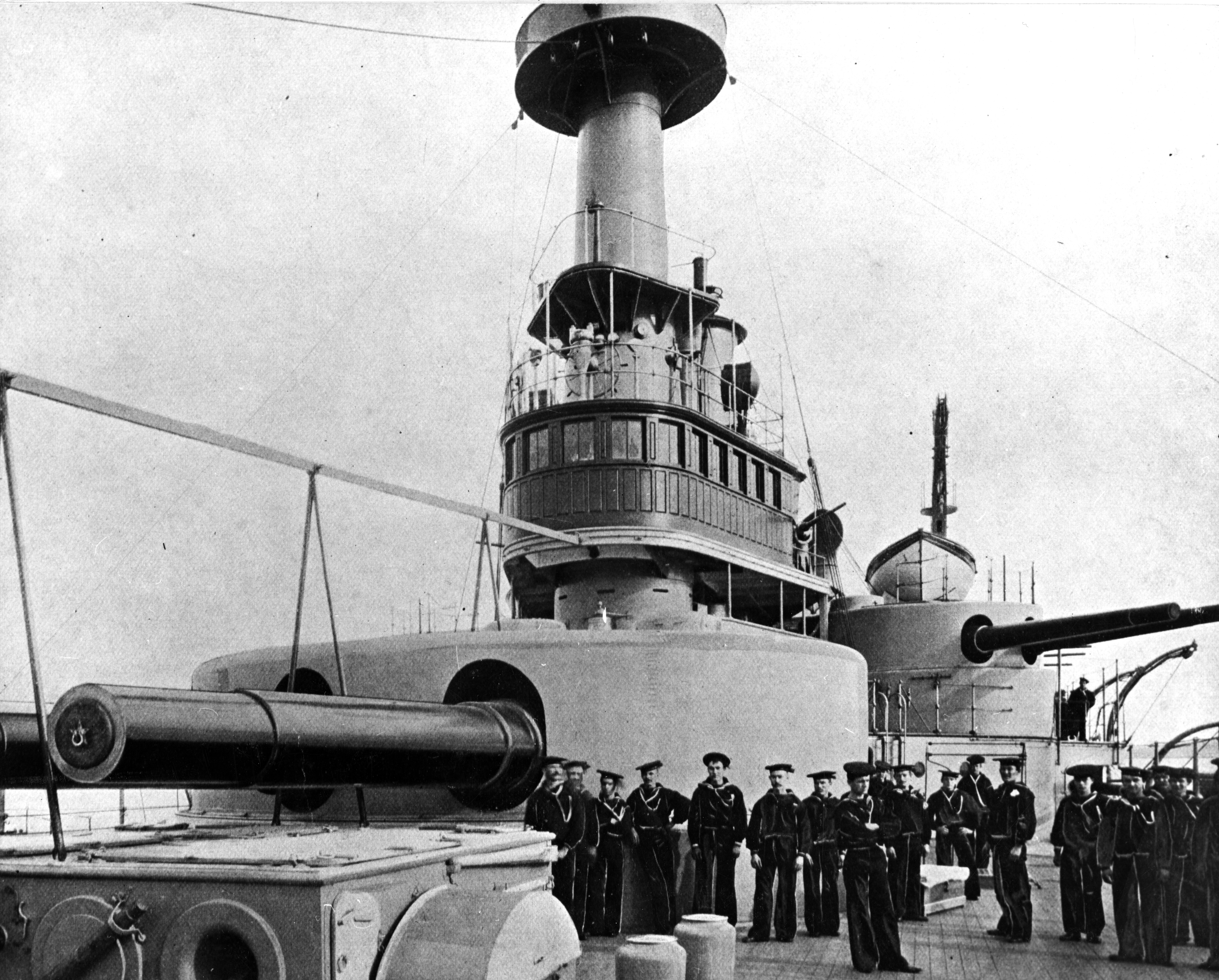
The forecastle of Indiana, showing its fore 13-inch turret and one of the 8-inch turrets

The 13-inch gun was 35 calibers long and used black powder, giving a range of about 12,000 yards (11,000 m) at 15 degrees of elevation. At 6,000 yards (5,500 m), a shell was expected to penetrate 10–12 inches (250–300 mm) of side armor. The four guns were mounted in two centerline turrets, located fore and aft. The turrets were originally designed to feature sloping side armor, but space requirements made this impossible without using significantly larger gun turrets or redesigning the gun mounts (which was later done for the Illinois-class battleships). The ships' low freeboard greatly hindered the use of the main battery in rough weather conditions, because the deck would become awash. Also, because the ship lacked a counterweight to offset the weight of the gun barrels, the ship would list in the direction the guns were aimed. This reduced the maximum arc of elevation (and thus range) to about five degrees, brought the main armor belt under water on that side, and exposed the unarmored bottom on the other. It was considered in 1901 to replace the turrets with new balanced models used in later ships, but that was decided to be too costly as the ships were already obsolete. Instead, counterweights were added, which partially solved the problem. The hydraulic rammers and turning mechanisms of the 8-inch turrets were also replaced by faster and more efficient electric equivalents, new sights were fitted on Indiana and Massachusetts, and new turret hoists were installed to improve the reloading speed, but the gun mountings never performed in an entirely satisfactory manner.

The eight 8-inch guns were mounted in pairs in four wing turrets placed on the superstructure. Their arc of fire, although big on paper, was in reality limited. Adjacent gun positions and superstructure would be damaged by their muzzle blast if the gun was trained alongside it, a defect also suffered by the 13-inch guns. The smaller 6-inch guns were mounted in twin wing casemates midships on the main deck level, with a 6-pounder in between. The other Hotchkiss 6-pounders lined the superstructure and bridge decks. Four of the 1-pounders were placed in hull casemates at the bow and stern of the ship and two more in the fighting tops of the masts. In 1908, all the 6-inch and most of the lighter guns were removed to compensate for the counterweights added to the main battery and because ammunition supply for the guns was considered problematic. A year later, twelve 3-inch (76 mm)/50-caliber single-purpose guns were added midships and in the fighting tops.

Sources conflict on the number of torpedo tubes originally included in the ships, but it is clear they were located on the berth deck and had above-water ports located on the extreme front and aft and midships. Each ship carried a total of 16 torpedoes. Located too close to the waterline to allow use while moving and vulnerable to gunfire when opened, they were considered useless and were quickly reduced in number, and removed entirely before 1908.

In 1918 there was a proposal to modify the three Indiana-class ships to carry a single 98-caliber 9-inch (229 mm) gun built by lining down a 50-caliber 14-inch (356 mm) gun to that size. Preliminary design of the turret for the gun was completed in October for service in mid-1919, but the end of the war the following month caused the program to be converted into a test program for long-range guns. The Bureau of Ordnance decided to first test a 7-inch (178 mm) gun lined down to 3 inches as a proof of concept, but those tests did not commence until 1922.

=== Protection ===
With the exception of the deck armor, 8-inch turrets and conning tower—which consisted of conventional nickel steel—the Indiana class was protected with the new Harvey armor. Its main protection was a belt 18 in (457 mm) thick, placed along two-thirds of the length of the hull from 3 ft (0.91 m) above to 1 ft (0.30 m) under the waterline. Beyond this point, the belt gradually grew thinner until it ended 4 ft 3 in (1.30 m) under the waterline, where the belt was only 8.5 in (220 mm) thick. Below the belt the ship had no armor, only a double bottom. On both ends the belt was connected to the barbettes of the main guns with 14-inch (360 mm) armored bulkheads. In the waterline sections outside this central citadel, compartments were filled with compressed cellulose, intended to self-seal when damaged. Between the deck and the main belt, 5-inch hull armor was used. The deck armor was 2.75 in (70 mm) thick inside the citadel and 3 in (76 mm) outside it. The hollow conning tower was a single forging 10 inches thick. The 13-inch gun battery had 15 in (380 mm) of vertical turret plating and 17-inch-thick (430 mm) barbettes, while the 8-inch cannons had only 6 inches of vertical turret plating and 8-inch-thick (200 mm) barbettes. The casemates protecting the 6-inch guns were 5 inches thick and the other casemates, lighter guns, shell hoists and turret crowns were all lightly armored. (Note: The armor of Oregon, built by a different shipyard, had slightly different dimensions: 8 in (200 mm) at the lowest point of the belt, 6.25 in (159 mm) on the hull and 4.5 in (110 mm) on the deck inside the citadel. She also had no double bottom outside the central citadel. See Reilly & Scheina 1980, pp. 56, 58 & 68.)

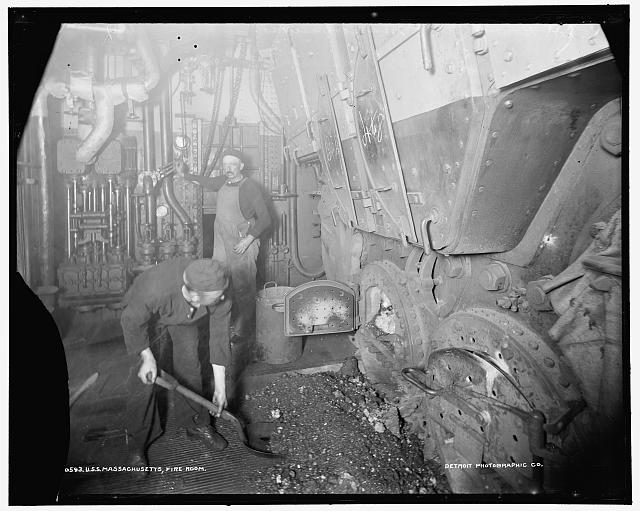
The fire room (boiler room) of Massachusetts

The placement of the belt armor was based on the draft from the design, which was 24 feet (7.3 m) with a normal load of 400 long tons (406 t; 448 short tons) of coal on board. Her total coal storage capacity was 1,600 long tons (1,626 t; 1,792 short tons), and fully loaded her draft would increase to 27 feet (8.2 m), entirely submerging the armor belt. During actual service, especially at war, the ships were kept fully loaded whenever possible, rendering her belt armor almost useless. That this was not considered in the design outraged the Walker policy board–convened in 1896 to evaluate the existing American battleships and propose a design for the new Illinois-class battleships–and they set a standard that the load of coal and ammunition that future ships were designed for had to be at least two-thirds of the maximum, so similar problems would be prevented in new ships.

=== Propulsion ===
Two vertical inverted triple expansion reciprocating steam engines powered by four double-ended Scotch boilers drove twin propellers, while two single-ended Scotch boilers supplied steam for auxiliary machinery. The engines were designed to provide 9,000 indicated horsepower (6,700 kW), giving the ships a top speed of 15 knots (28 km/h; 17 mph). During sea trials, which were conducted with limited amounts of coal, ammunition and supplies on board, it was found that the indicated horsepower and top speed exceeded design values and a significant variation between the three ships existed. The engines of Indiana delivered 9,700 ihp (7,200 kW), giving a top speed of 15.6 kn (28.9 km/h; 18.0 mph). Massachusetts had a top speed of 16.2 kn (30.0 km/h; 18.6 mph) with 10,400 ihp (7,800 kW) and Oregon reached a speed of 16.8 kn (31.1 km/h; 19.3 mph) with 11,000 ihp (8,200 kW). Eight Babcock & Wilcox boilers, including four with superheaters, were installed on Indiana in 1904 and the same number on Massachusetts in 1907 to replace the outdated Scotch boilers.

== Ships in class ==
Name	Hull	Builder	Laid down	Launched	Commissioned	Fate
Indiana	BB-1	William Cramp & Sons	7 May 1891	28 February 1893	20 November 1895	Sunk in explosive tests; hulk sold for scrap 1924
Massachusetts	BB-2	William Cramp & Sons	25 June 1891	10 June 1893	10 June 1896	Sunk as gunnery target 1921; now an artificial reef
Oregon	BB-3	Union Iron Works	19 November 1891	26 October 1893	16 July 1896	Initially preserved as a museum; sold for scrap 1956

=== Indiana (BB-1) ===
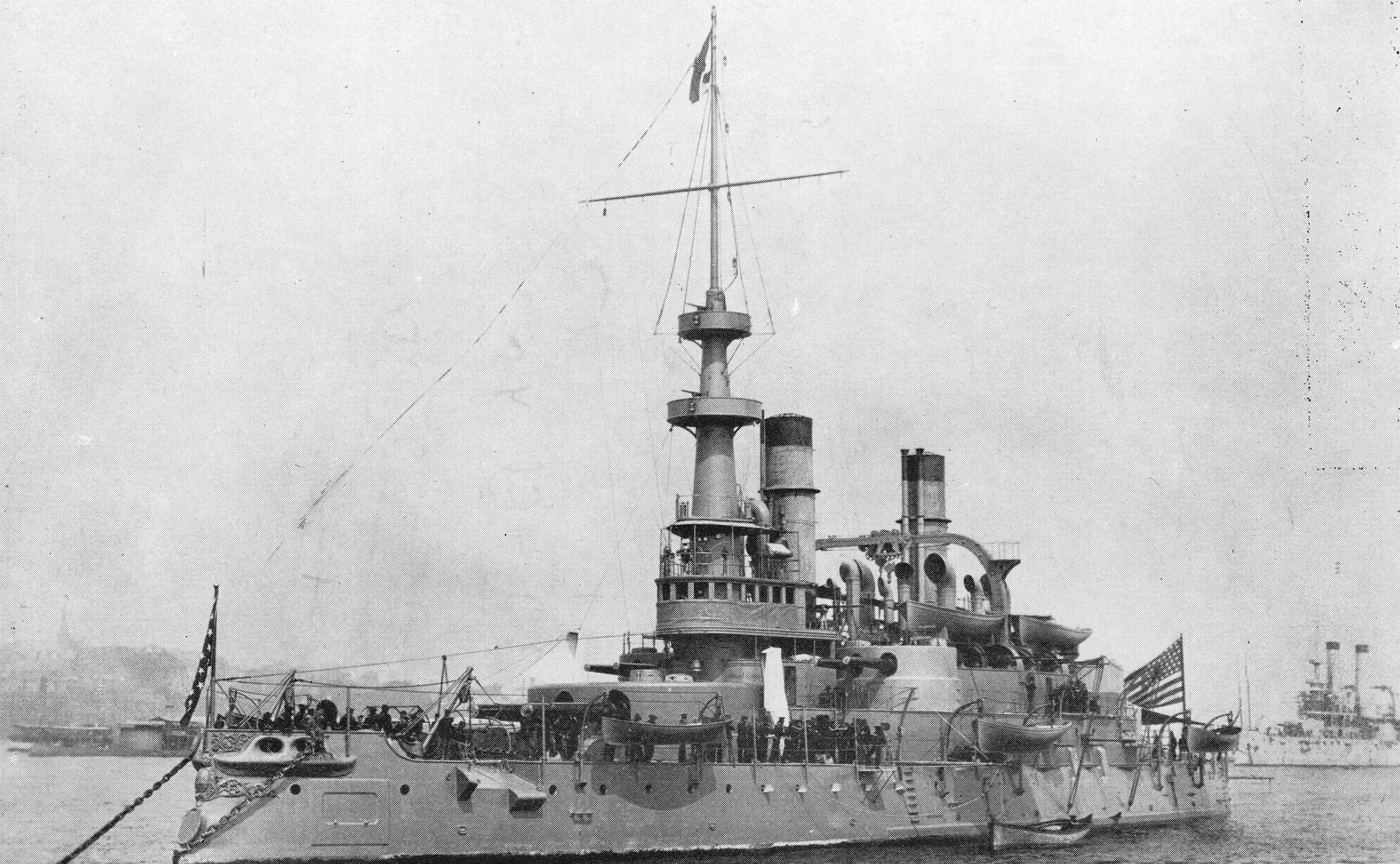
Indiana after the Spanish–American War, Iowa in the background

Commissioned in 1895, Indiana did not participate in any notable events until the outbreak of the Spanish–American War in 1898, when Indiana was part of the North Atlantic Squadron under Rear Admiral William T. Sampson. His squadron was ordered to the Spanish port of San Juan in an attempt to intercept and destroy Admiral Cevera's Spanish squadron, which was en route to the Caribbean from Spain. The harbor was empty, but Indiana and the rest of the squadron bombarded it for two hours before realizing their mistake. Three weeks later news arrived that Commodore Schley's Flying Squadron had found Cervera and was now blockading him in the port of Santiago de Cuba. Sampson reinforced Schley two days later and assumed overall command. Cervera saw that his situation was desperate and attempted to run the blockade on 3 July 1898. Indiana did not join in the chase of the fast Spanish cruisers because of her extreme eastern position on the blockade and low speed caused by engine problems, but was near the harbor entrance when the Spanish destroyers Plutón and Furor emerged. Together with the battleship Iowa and armed yacht Gloucester she opened fire, destroying the lightly armored enemy ships.

After the war, Indiana returned to training exercises before being decommissioned in 1903. The battleship was recommissioned in January 1906 to function as a training vessel until she was decommissioned again in 1914. Her third commission was in 1917 when Indiana served as a training ship for gun crews during World War I. She was decommissioned for the final time on 31 January 1919, shortly after being reclassified Coast Battleship Number 1 so that the name Indiana could be assigned to the newly authorized—but never completed—battleship Indiana (BB-50). She was sunk in shallow water as a target in underwater explosion and aerial bombing tests in November 1920. Her hulk was sold for scrap on 19 March 1924.

=== Massachusetts (BB-2) ===
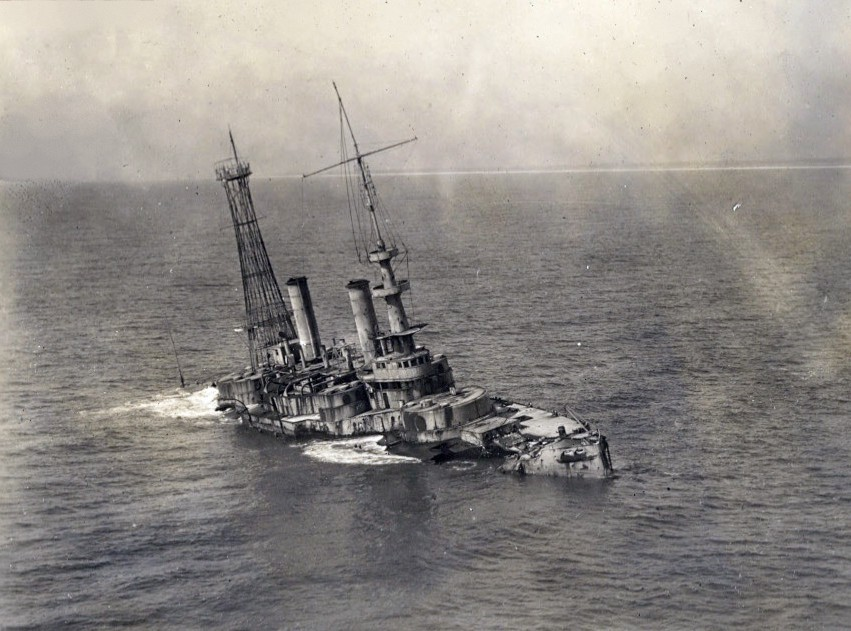
Massachusetts being scuttled off the coast of Pensacola

Between being commissioned in 1896 and the outbreak of the Spanish–American War in 1898, Massachusetts conducted training exercises off the eastern coast of the United States. During the war, she was placed in the Flying Squadron under Commodore Winfield Scott Schley. Schley went searching for Cervera's Spanish squadron and found it in the port of Santiago. The battleship was part of the blockade fleet until 3 July, but missed the Battle of Santiago de Cuba, because she had steamed to Guantánamo Bay the night before to resupply coal. The next day, the battleship came back to Santiago, where she and Texas fired at the Spanish cruiser Reina Mercedes, which was being scuttled by the Spanish in a failed attempt to block the harbor entrance channel.

During the next seven years, Massachusetts cruised the Atlantic coast and eastern Caribbean as a member of the North Atlantic Squadron and then served for a year as a training ship for Naval Academy midshipmen until she was decommissioned in January 1906. In May 1910, she was placed in reduced commission as a training ship again before entering the Atlantic Reserve Fleet in September 1912, where she stayed until being decommissioned in May 1914. Massachusetts was recommissioned in June 1917 to serve as a training ship for gun crews during World War I. She was decommissioned for the final time on 31 March 1919, after being redesignated Coast Battleship Number 2 two days earlier so her name could be reused for Massachusetts (BB-54). On 6 January 1921 she was scuttled off the coast of Pensacola and used as an artillery target for Fort Pickens. The Navy attempted to sell her for scrap, but no buyer could be found and in 1956 the ship was declared the property of the state of Florida. The wreck is currently one of the Florida Underwater Archaeological Preserves and serves as an artificial reef.

=== Oregon (BB-3) ===
Oregon served for a short time with the Pacific Station before being ordered on a voyage around South America to the East Coast in March 1898 in preparation for war with Spain. She departed from San Francisco on 19 March, and reached Jupiter Inlet on 24 May, stopping several times for additional coal on the way. A journey of over 14,000 nautical miles was completed in 66 days, which was considered a remarkable achievement at the time. The Dictionary of American Naval Fighting Ships describes the effect of the journey on the American public and government as follows: "On one hand the feat had demonstrated the many capabilities of a heavy battleship in all conditions of wind and sea. On the other it swept away all opposition for the construction of the Panama Canal, for it was then made clear that the country could not afford to take two months to send warships from one coast to the other each time an emergency arose." After completing her journey, Oregon was ordered to join the blockade at Santiago as part of the North Atlantic Squadron under Rear Admiral Sampson. She took part in the Battle of Santiago de Cuba, where she and the cruiser Brooklyn were the only ships fast enough to chase down the Spanish cruiser Cristobal Colon, forcing its surrender. Around this time, she received the nickname "Bulldog of the Navy", most likely because of her high bow wave—known as "having a bone in her teeth" in nautical slang—and perseverance during the cruise around South America and the battle of Santiago.

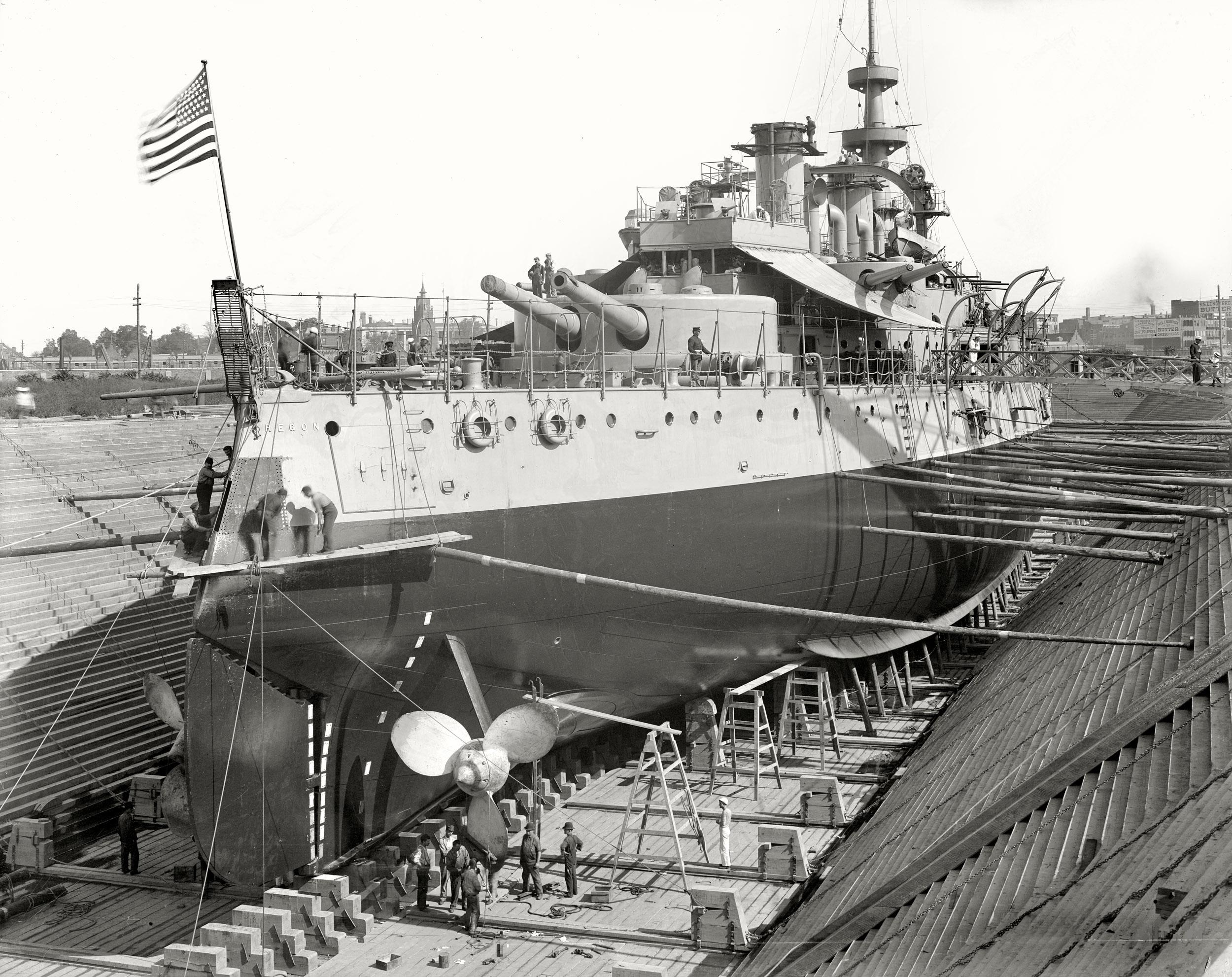
Oregon in drydock in 1898, showing her starboard bilge keel and pudgy underwater shape

After the war, Oregon was refitted in New York City before she was sent back to the Pacific, where she served as a guard ship for two years. She served for a year in the Philippines during the Philippine–American War and then spent a year in China at Wusong during the Boxer Rebellion until May 1901, when she was ordered back to the United States for an overhaul. In March 1903, Oregon returned to Asiatic waters and the ship remained in the Far East, returning only shortly before decommissioning in April 1906. Oregon was recommissioned in August 1911, but saw little activity and was officially placed on reserve status in 1914. On 2 January 1915, the ship was returned to full commission and sailed to San Francisco for the Panama–Pacific International Exposition. A year later, she was back to reserve status, only to be returned to full commission in April 1917 when the United States joined World War I. Oregon acted as one of the escorts for transport ships during the Siberian Intervention. In June 1919, she was decommissioned, but a month later she was temporarily recommissioned as the reviewing ship for President Woodrow Wilson during the arrival of the Pacific Fleet at Seattle. In October 1919, she was decommissioned for the final time. As a result of the Washington Naval Treaty, Oregon was declared "incapable of further warlike service" in January 1924. In June 1925, she was loaned to the State of Oregon, who used her as a floating monument and museum in Portland.

In February 1941, Oregon was redesignated IX-22. Due to the outbreak of World War II, it was decided that the scrap value of the ship was more important than her historical value, so she was sold. Her stripped hulk was later returned to the Navy and used as an ammunition barge during the battle of Guam, where she remained for several years. During a typhoon in November 1948, she broke loose and drifted out to sea. She was located 500 mi (800 km) southeast of Guam and towed back. She was sold on 15 March 1956 and scrapped in Japan.

== See also ==
- Battleship Illinois (replica)

== Bibliography ==
=== Print references ===
- Chesneau, Roger; Koleśnik, Eugène M.; Campbell, N.J.M. (1979). Conway's All the World's Fighting Ships 1860–1905. London: Conway Maritime Press. ISBN 978-0-85177-133-5.
- Friedman, Norman (1985). U.S. Battleships, An Illustrated Design History. Annapolis, Maryland: Naval Institute Press. ISBN 978-0-87021-715-9.
- Gardiner, Robert; Lambert, Andrew D. (1992). Steam, Steel & Shellfire: The Steam Warship 1815–1905. London: Conway Maritime Press. ISBN 978-0-85177-564-7.
- Graham, George E.; Schley, Winfield S. (1902). Schley and Santiago: an historical account of the blockade and final destruction of the Spanish fleet under command of Admiral Pasquale Cervera, July 3, 1898. Texas: W.B. Conkey company. OCLC 1866852.
- Reilly, John C.; Scheina, Robert L. (1980). American Battleships 1886–1923: Predreadnought Design and Construction. London: Arms and Armour Press. ISBN 978-0-85368-446-6.
- "The Speed Trial of the United States Battleship Massachusetts". Scientific American. 74: 297. 9 May 1896.; cited in Reilly & Scheina 1980, p. 210
- Wright, Christopher C. (2007). "Question 40/04: Proposed Conversion of Old U.S. Battleships to Monitors". Warship International. XLIV (2): 143–14. ISSN 0043-0374.

=== Dictionary of American Naval Fighting Ships ===
- "Indiana". Dictionary of American Naval Fighting Ships. Navy Department, Naval History and Heritage Command.
- "Massachusetts". Dictionary of American Naval Fighting Ships. Navy Department, Naval History & Heritage Command.
- "Oregon". Dictionary of American Naval Fighting Ships. Navy Department, Naval History & Heritage Command.

=== Other ===
- Bryan, B. C. (1901). "The Steaming Radius of United States Naval Vessels". Journal of the American Society for Naval Engineers. 13 (1): 50–69. doi:10.1111/j.1559-3584.1901.tb03372.x. (subscription required)
- Lomax, Ken (2005). "A Chronicle of the Battleship Oregon". Oregon Historical Quarterly. 106 (1). Portland, Oregon: Oregon Historical Society: 132–146. doi:10.1353/ohq.2005.0088. JSTOR 20615507. S2CID 245845492. Archived from the original on 17 June 2008.
- "USS Massachusetts". Florida's "Museums in the Sea".
- "Budget of the US Navy: 1794 to 2004". history.navy.mil. US Navy. 27 April 2006. Archived from the original on 28 January 2012.
- "United States of America 13"/35 (33 cm) Mark 1 and Mark 2". NavWeaps.com. 15 August 2008.
