= USS Oregon (BB-3) =

Indiana-class pre-dreadnought battleship of the United States Navy

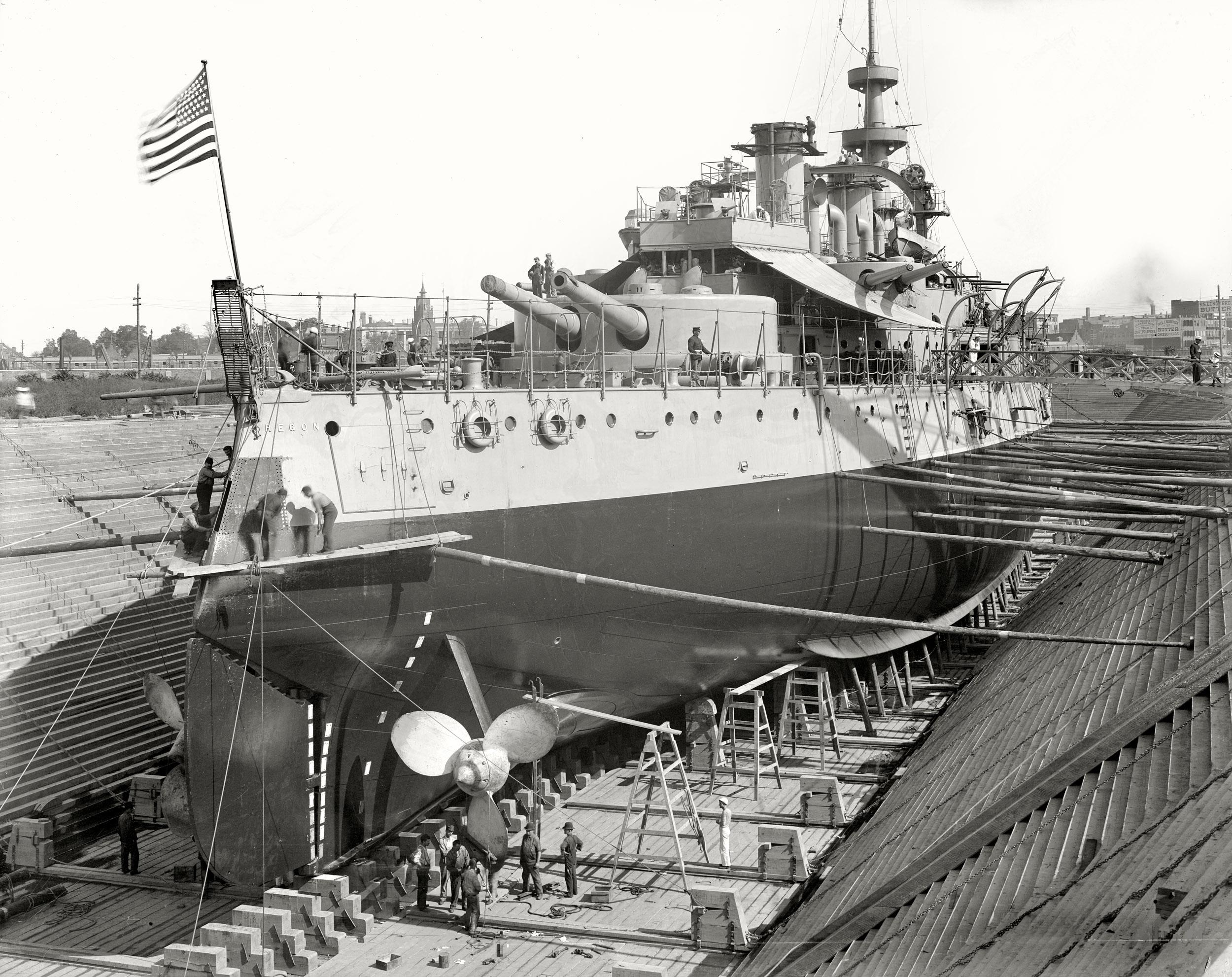
- USS Oregon in dry dock, 1898

History

United States
- Name: Oregon
- Namesake: Oregon
- Ordered: 30 June 1890
- Builder: Union Iron Works
- Laid down: 19 November 1891
- Launched: 26 October 1893
- Commissioned: 15 July 1896
- Decommissioned: 27 April 1906
- Recommissioned: 29 August 1911
- Decommissioned: 12 June 1919
- Stricken: 2 November 1942
- Identification: Hull symbol: BB-3
- Fate: Sold for scrap, 15 March 1956

General characteristics
- Class & type: Indiana-class pre-dreadnought battleship
- Displacement: Normal: 10,288 long tons (10,453 t); Full load: 11,688 long tons (11,876 t)
- Length: 351 feet 2 inches (107.04 m)
- Beam: 69 ft 3 in (21.11 m)
- Draft: 24 ft (7.3 m)
- Installed power: 4 × fire-tube boilers; 9,000 ihp (6,700 kW)
- Propulsion: 2 × triple-expansion steam engines; 2 × screw propellers
- Speed: 15 kn (28 km/h; 17 mph) (design)
- Range: 4,900 nmi (9,100 km; 5,600 mi)
- Complement: 473 officers and men
- Armament: 2 × twin 13 in (330 mm)/35 caliber guns; 4 × twin 8 in (203 mm)/35 caliber guns; 4 × single 6 in (152 mm)/40 caliber guns; 20 × single 6-pounder guns; 6 × single 1 pounder guns; 5–6 × 18 in (457 mm) torpedo tubes
- Armor: Belt: 4 to 18 in (102 to 457 mm); Turrets: 17 in (432 mm); Barbettes: 17 in; Conning Tower: 10 in (254 mm)

USS Oregon was the third and final member of the Indiana class of pre-dreadnought battleships built for the United States Navy in the 1890s. The three ships were built as part of a modernization program aimed at strengthening the American fleet to prepare for a possible conflict with a European navy. Designed for short-range operations in defense of the United States, the three Indiana-class ships had a low freeboard and carried a main battery of four 13-inch (330 mm) guns in a pair of gun turrets. Oregon and her sister ships were the first modern battleships built for the United States, though they suffered from significant stability and seakeeping problems owing to their small size and insufficient freeboard.

After entering service in 1896, Oregon briefly served with the Pacific Squadron before being transferred to the East Coast of the United States as tensions with Spain over Cuba grew in early 1898. She completed a 14,000-nautical-mile (26,000 km; 16,000 mi) journey around South America in the span of 66 days, arriving shortly after the start of the Spanish–American War. She thereafter took part in the blockade of Santiago de Cuba, which culminated in the Battle of Santiago de Cuba on 3 July, where Oregon contributed to the destruction of the Spanish squadron in Cuba. After the war, Oregon was deployed to the Asiatic Squadron, serving during the Philippine–American War and the Boxer Rebellion in Qing China. The ship returned to the United States in 1906, when she was decommissioned and placed in reserve for the next five years, during which she was modernized.

Reactivated in 1911, Oregon spent the next several years cruising off the West Coast of the United States, frequently going in and out of service. During the Allied intervention in the Russian Civil War in 1918, she escorted a convoy for the Siberian expedition. The ship was decommissioned in 1919 and allocated the hull number BB-3 the following year. Efforts by naval enthusiasts in the early 1920s led the Navy to loan Oregon to her namesake state for use as a museum ship. After the start of World War II, the Navy decided in late 1942 to scrap the ship for the war effort, but after work began the Navy requested the ship's return for use as an ammunition hulk for the upcoming invasion of Guam in 1944. She remained off the island through the mid-1950s before being sold for scrap in 1956 and broken up in Japan.

== Design ==
In the late 1880s, the United States Navy's senior commanders began to plan for the possibility of a conflict with a European naval power, eventually coming to the conclusion that a force of both short- and long-range battleships would be necessary to defend the country. Congress agreed to begin modernizing the Navy and authorized three small vessels—the ironclad battleship Texas and the armored cruisers Maine and New York. Three further ships, the Indiana class, were authorized in 1890; these were to be the first installment of short-range battleships to meet the Navy's plans. The ships proved to be disappointments in service, as they were badly overweight upon completion, their low freeboard hampered operations at sea, and they handled poorly. They were nevertheless the first modern battleships for the American fleet.

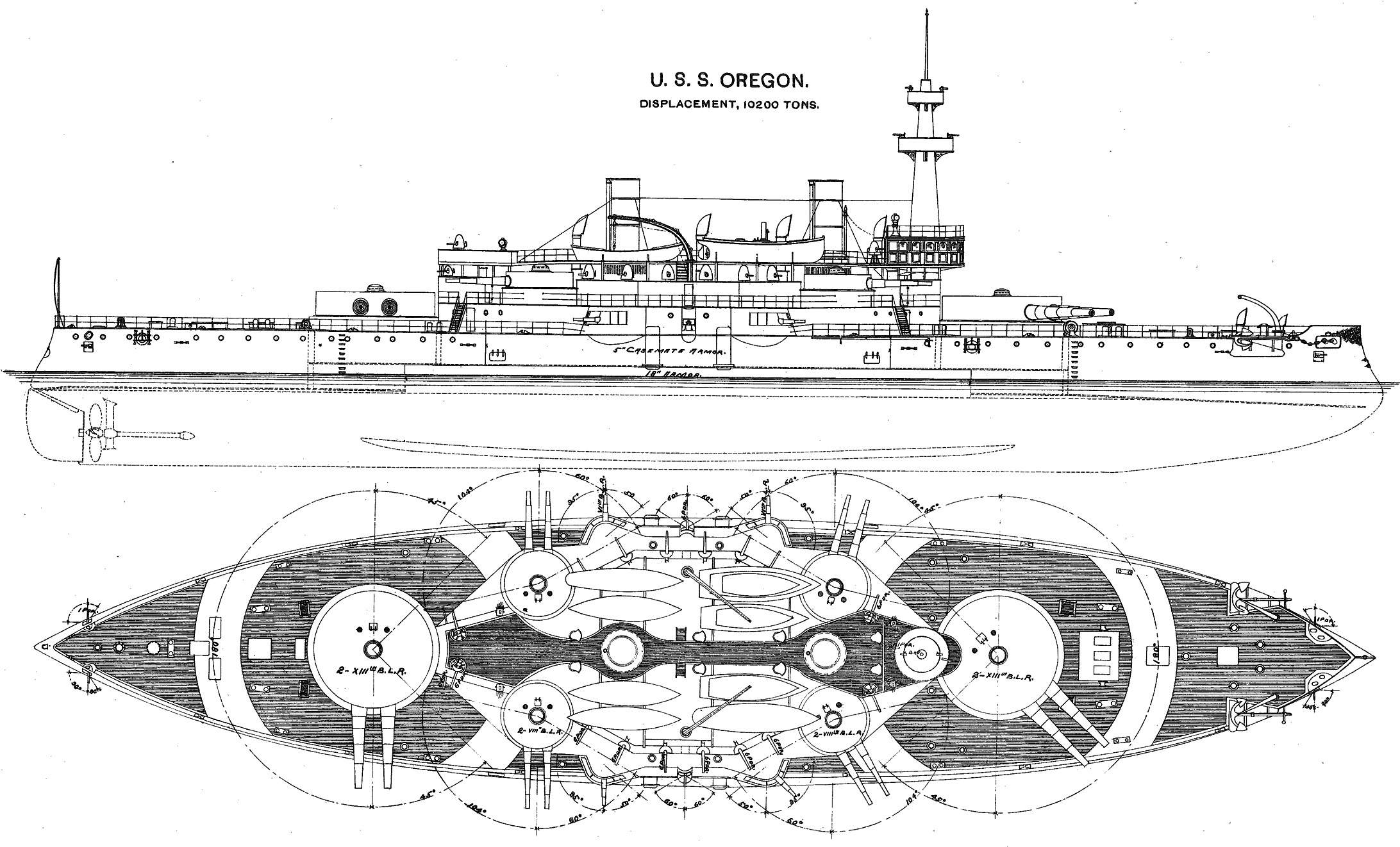
Top and profile illustration of Oregon

Oregon was 351 feet 2 inches (107.04 m) long overall and had a beam of 69 ft 3 in (21.11 m) and a draft of 24 ft (7.3 m). She displaced 10,288 long tons (10,453 t) as designed and up to 11,688 long tons (11,876 t) at full load. The ship was powered by two-shaft triple-expansion steam engines rated at 9,000 indicated horsepower (6,700 kW) and four coal-fired fire-tube boilers, generating a top speed of 15 knots (28 km/h; 17 mph). She had a cruising radius of 5,640 nautical miles (10,450 km; 6,490 mi) at a speed of 10 knots (19 km/h; 12 mph). As built, she was fitted with a heavy military mast, this was later supplemented by a stern cage mast in 1910–1911. She had a crew of 32 officers and 441 enlisted men, which increased to a total of 586–636 officers and enlisted.

The ship was armed with a main battery of four 13 in (330 mm) /35 caliber guns in two twin gun turrets on the centerline, one forward and aft. The secondary battery consisted of eight 8-inch (203 mm) /35 cal. guns, which were placed in four twin wing turrets. These were supported by a battery of six 6 in (150 mm) /40 cal. guns in a casemate battery amidships. For close-range defense against torpedo boats, she carried twenty 6-pounder guns and six 1-pounder guns in individual mounts. As was standard for capital ships of the period, Oregon carried 18 in (457 mm) torpedo tubes in above-water mounts, though the number is unclear. According to Conway's All the World's Fighting Ships and the US Navy's Dictionary of American Naval Fighting Ships, she was fitted with six tubes, though the naval historian Norman Friedman states she was ordered with seven but completed with five.

Oregon's main armored belt was 18 in (457 mm) thick over the magazines and the machinery spaces and was reduced to 4 in (102 mm) at the bow and stern. The main battery gun turrets had 17-inch (432 mm) thick sides, and the supporting barbettes had the same thickness of armor plate on their exposed sides. The 8 in turrets had 6 in of armor plating and the casemate battery had 5 in (127 mm). The conning tower had 10 in (254 mm) thick sides.

== Service history ==
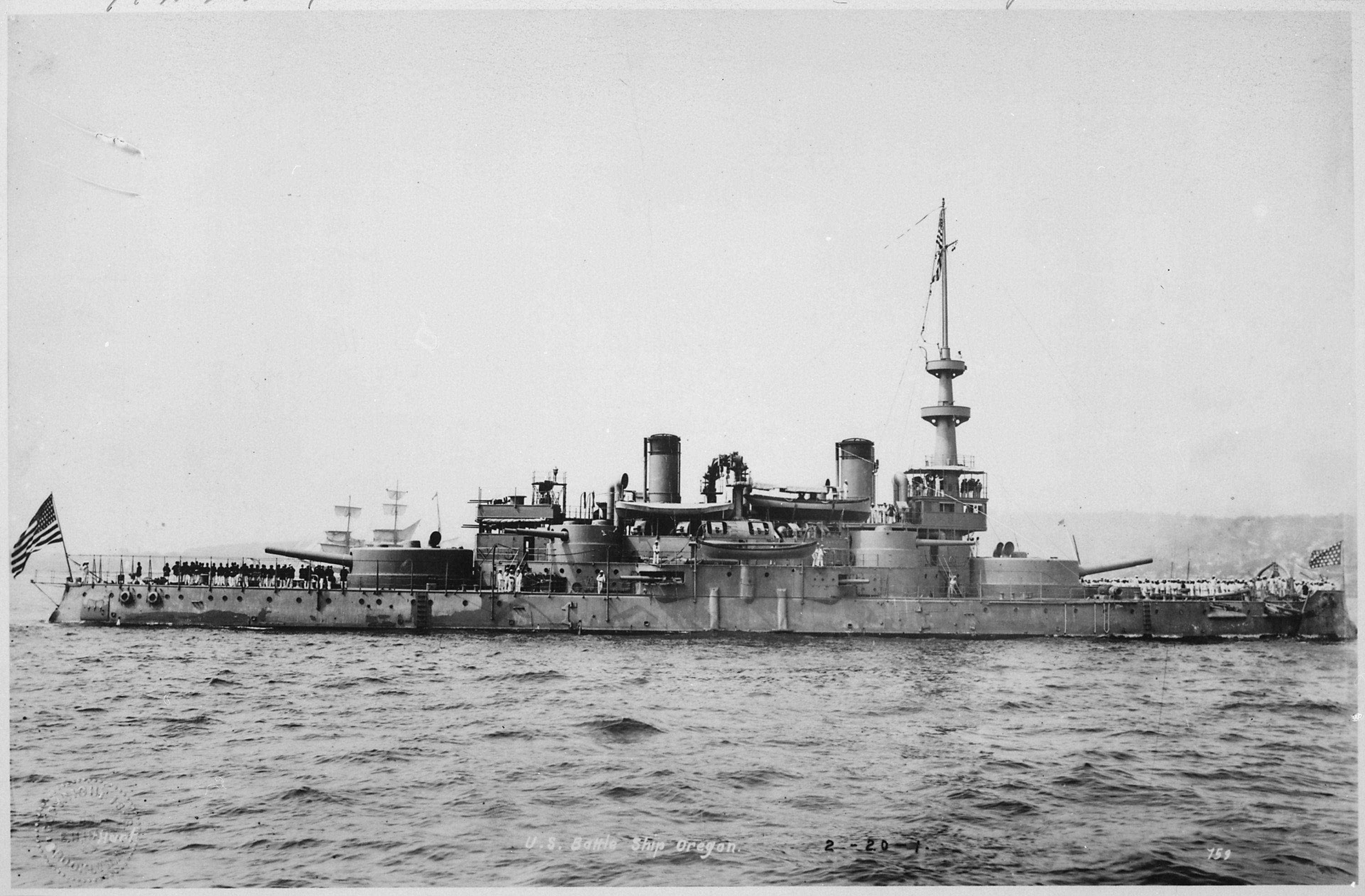
USS Oregon in 1898

Congress authorized three Indiana-class battleships on 30 June 1890, and in the authorization, specified that one of the ships was to be built on the West Coast of the United States. Therefore, after the first two vessels—Indiana and Massachusetts—were awarded to William Cramp & Sons of Philadelphia, the contract for the third was given to Union Iron Works in San Francisco. Her keel was laid down on 19 November 1891 and her completed hull was launched on 26 October 1893. After completing fitting-out, she was commissioned into the fleet on 15 July 1896. She then completed sea trials as part of the Pacific Squadron, where she served for the next year.

On 15 February 1898, the armored cruiser Maine exploded in Havana, Cuba during a period of rising tensions between the United States and Spain, which possessed Cuba as part of its colonial empire. Oregon, which was in dry dock at the time, was refloated the next day and placed under the command of Captain Charles Edgar Clark. Initial reports blamed a Spanish naval mine, and as the threat of war between the two countries grew, Oregon was ordered to steam to the East Coast of the United States to strengthen the North Atlantic Squadron. She steamed south to San Francisco, California to load ammunition on 9 March, departing ten days later for the long voyage around South America, a distance of some 14,000 nmi (25,900 km; 16,100 mi). Oregon reached Callao, Peru on 4 April, where she took on a fresh load of coal before continuing on the journey.

Clark decided to skip the scheduled coaling stop in Valparaíso, Chile, electing to proceed to the Strait of Magellan directly, which the ship reached on 16 April. A severe storm complicated her passage through the hazardous waters and she was forced to drop anchor overnight to avoid running aground, but she reached Punta Arenas, Chile, the next morning. There, she joined the gunboat Marietta, which was also en route to join the North Atlantic Squadron. After both ships replenished their coal stocks there, they got underway for Rio de Janeiro, Brazil, on 21 April; false rumors of a Spanish torpedo boat in the area kept the ships' gun crews at their stations. The ships reached Rio de Janeiro on 30 April, where they learned of the state of war between the United States and Spain. They departed on 4 May, stopped briefly in Salvador, Bahia, Brazil, and then coaled in Barbados on 18 May. Oregon arrived in Jupiter, Florida on 24 May, where she met other elements of the North Atlantic Squadron. In the course of the voyage, which lasted sixty-six days, Oregon had traveled some 14,000 nmi (26,000 km; 16,000 mi). One long term result of this trip, which had received extensive press coverage, was public pressure for the construction of a Panama Canal to shorten future trans-oceanic repositionings.

=== Spanish–American War ===
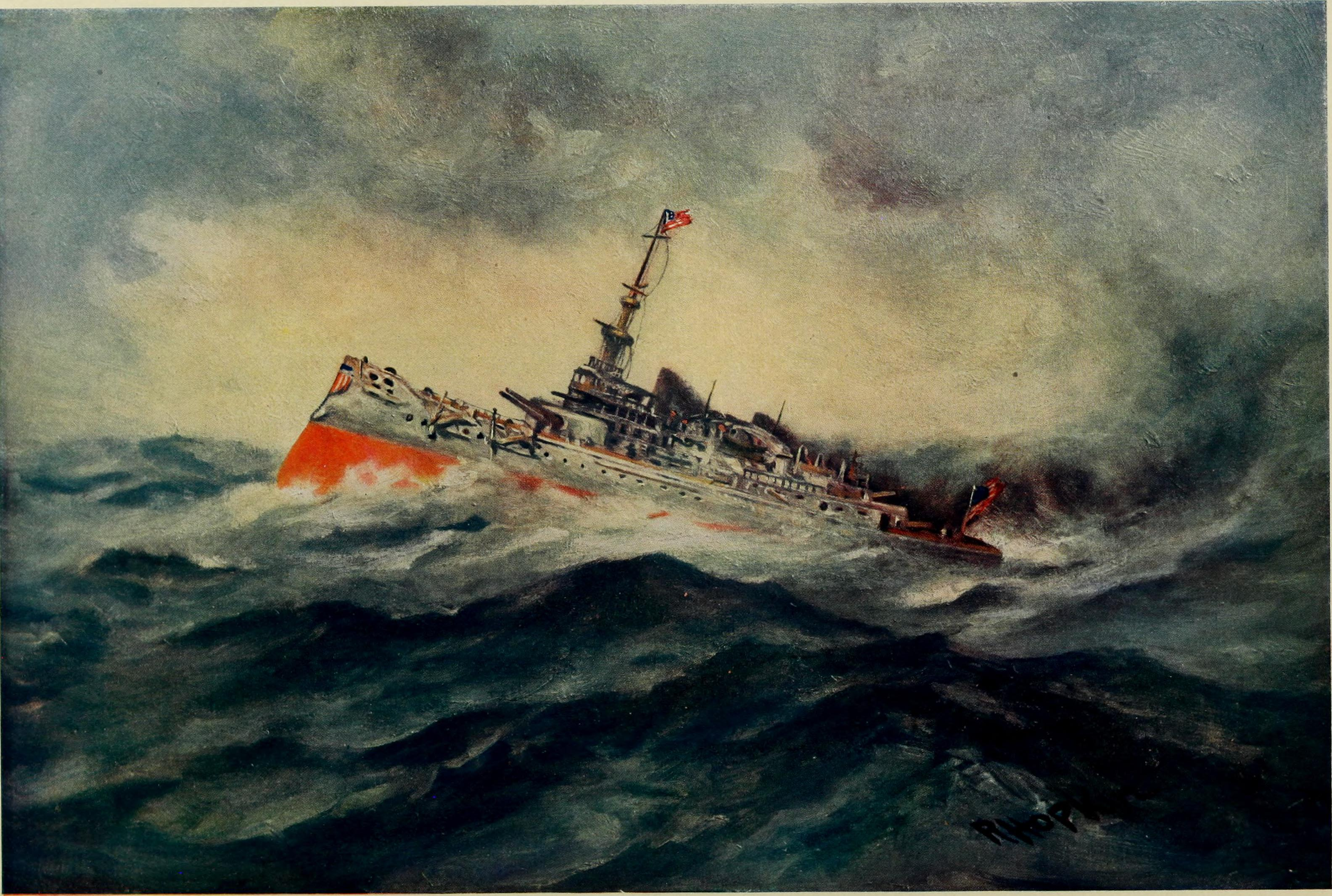
Painting of Oregon passing Cape Horn on the way to the Caribbean

Oregon sailed to Key West on 26 May, where she joined the rest of the North Atlantic Squadron, under the command of Rear Admiral William T. Sampson. By that time, the Flying Squadron, under Commodore Winfield Scott Schley's command, had located the Spanish squadron that had sailed to Cuba at the start of the war and had blockaded it in Santiago de Cuba. The Spanish squadron was commanded by Rear Admiral Pascual Cervera y Topete and consisted of the armored cruisers Infanta Maria Teresa, Cristóbal Colón, Vizcaya and Almirante Oquendo and the destroyers Plutón and Furor. Oregon arrived off that port on 1 June, and over the course of the month, took part in bombardments of Spanish positions around the city and helped to maintain the blockade.

At 08:45 on 3 July, Cervera sortied with his flag aboard Infanta Maria Teresa, followed by Cristóbal Colón, Vizcaya and Almirante Oquendo, with the two destroyers bringing up the rear. The Spaniards cleared the roadstead at 09:35; luckily for the Spanish, New York—Sampson's flagship—was out of position at the time and Massachusetts was replenishing her coal at Guantánamo Bay. Lookouts aboard the armored cruiser Brooklyn spotted Cervera approaching and fired one of her guns to warn the other American ships, which quickly ordered their crews to general quarters and initiated the Battle of Santiago de Cuba. As the Spanish ships attempted to break out to the west, Cervera charged at Brooklyn with Infanta Maria Teresa to delay the American pursuit and give his other ships time to escape. The Spanish coastal batteries also contributed their fire in the first stage of the battle but had little effect.

Oregon took the lead in the ensuing chase as she was the only large American ship which had good steam pressure when the battle began. The cruiser Brooklyn had uncoupled two of her four engines, but could still achieve 17 knots (31 km/h; 20 mph) and was right behind her. Heavy American gunfire had set Infanta Maria Theresa on fire, and, fearing a magazine explosion, Cervara ordered her run aground at 10:25. Almirante Oquendo's captain issued similar instructions five minutes later, as his ship, too, was burning badly. Vizcaya was also forced ashore shortly thereafter, striking her colors to surrender at 10:36. Meanwhile, the two Spanish destroyers had also been badly damaged by the American battleships; Indiana had nearly cut Plutón in half with a 13-inch shell, forcing her to run aground, where she exploded. And Furor had been savaged by Oregon's, Iowa's, and Indiana's secondary batteries, leading her crew to surrender to the gunboat Gloucester.

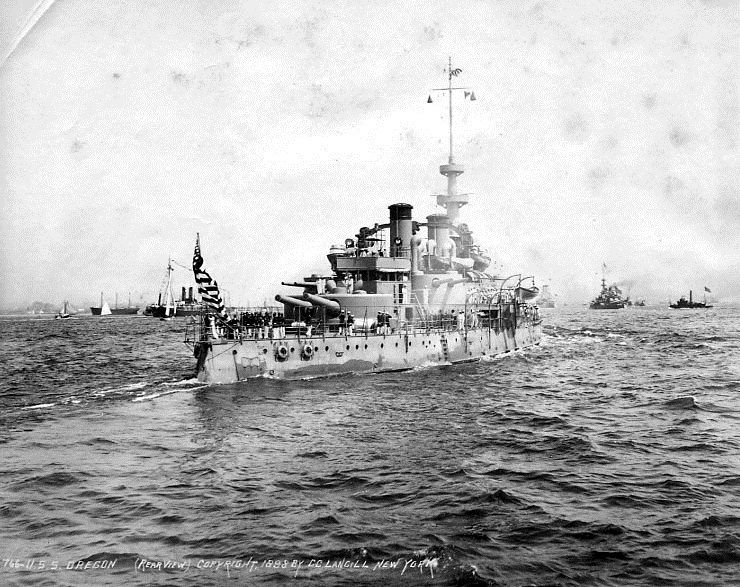
Oregon in New York Harbor during the Spanish–American War naval review

Only Cristóbal Colón, which had a 6 nautical miles (11 km; 6.9 mi) lead at that point, was still running westward. Oregon and Texas followed Brooklyn as they chased Cristóbal Colón; the Americans slowly caught up to the fleeing Spanish cruiser and engaged her at long range. Cristóbal Colón, which had not been fitted with her main armament before being sent to Cuba, could not return fire, and her commander realized his hopeless position. At 13:20, he turned to shore and struck his flag, indicating his surrender, and the crew scuttled the ship. Oregon was not hit in the action, owing in large part to the poor quality of Spanish shooting. With the destruction of Cervera's squadron and American successes in Cuba and the Philippines, Spain sued for peace on 17 July, and the war ended on 12 August with the Treaty of Paris.

=== Asiatic Station ===
After the war, Oregon steamed to New York for an overhaul, after which she was assigned to the Asiatic Squadron in October. She reached Manila in the Philippines on 18 March 1899 and operated there for the next year during the Philippine–American War. During this period, she assisted with the blockade of Manila and Lingayen Gulf and supported the capture of the city of Vigan. On 13 February 1900, Oregon departed for a visit to Japan that lasted into May, when she steamed to Hong Kong. By that time, the Boxer Rebellion had broken out in Qing China, and the ship was ordered to steam to Taku, China, on 23 June to reinforce the Eight-Nation Alliance forces that were gathering there. While passing through the Bohai Strait on 28 June, she struck an uncharted rock, running hard aground. She remained on the rock for a week before being re-floated on 5 July. After completing temporary repairs, she steamed to Kure, Japan to be dry-docked for permanent repairs on 17 July.

Oregon got underway again on 29 August for operations along the coast of China. She patrolled off the mouth of the Yangtze River and was then stationed at Wusong in Shanghai, China until 5 May 1901. That day, she departed to return to the United States for a refit, sailing first to Yokohama, Japan, and then to Honolulu, Hawaii. From there, she steamed to San Francisco, arriving there on 12 June. She then steamed north to the Puget Sound Navy Yard, which she reached on 6 July. She remained there for a year and a half before departing in early 1903 for China. She arrived in Hong Kong on 18 March, and over the course of the next three years, she served on the Asiatic Station, visiting ports in China, Japan, and the Philippines. The period passed uneventfully for Oregon, and she returned to the United States in February 1906. She was decommissioned in Puget Sound on 27 April.

=== Later career ===
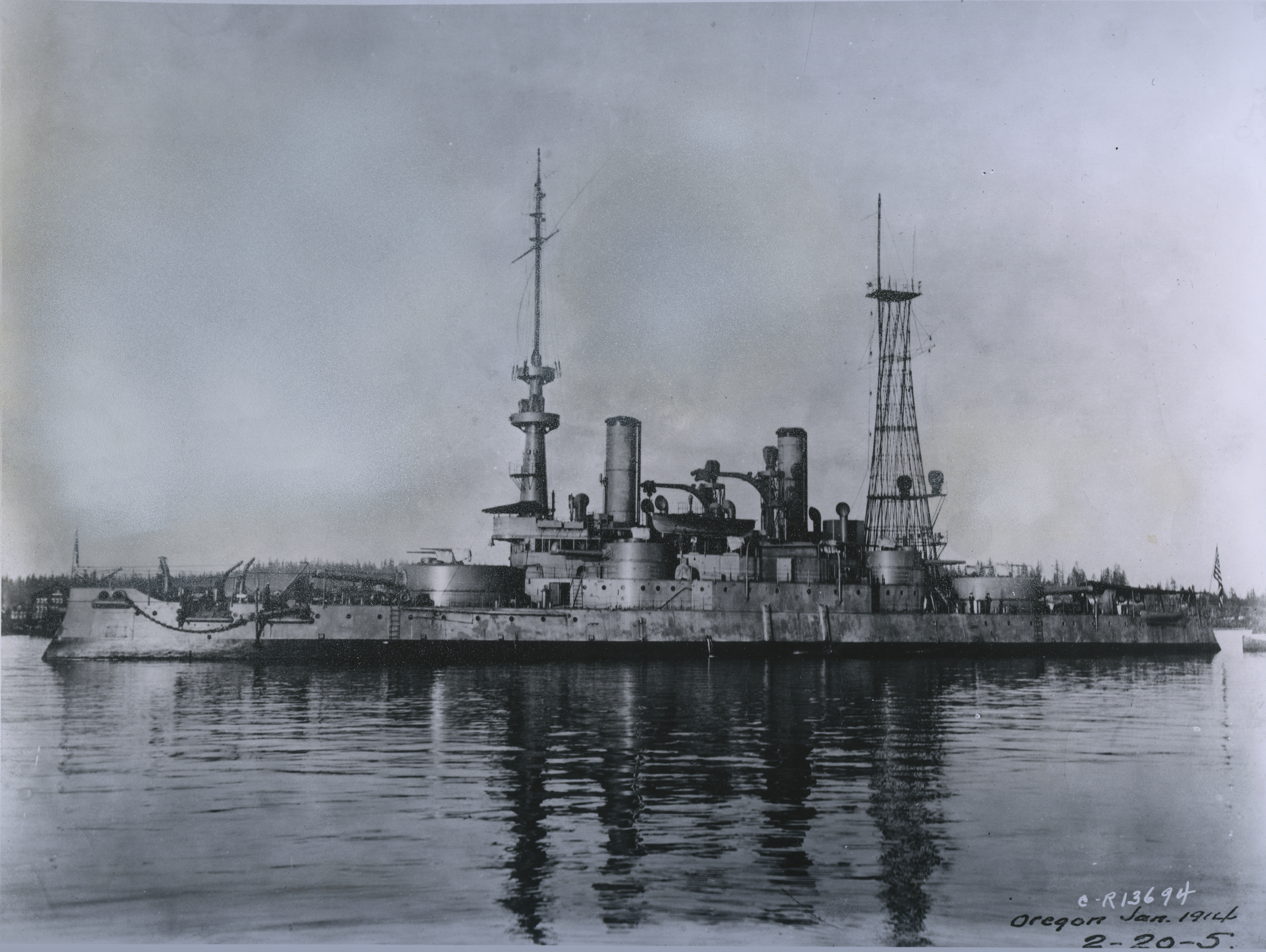
Oregon in January 1914

The ship remained out of service for the next five years. She received a fairly minimal modernization during her period in reserve, which included the installation of a cage main mast. She also had her slow-firing 6-inch guns removed and a battery of twelve 3 in (76 mm) quick-firing guns was installed to improve her defenses against torpedo-boats, which had grown in size and power since Oregon's construction. These were placed in single mounts, with four in an open battery atop the deckhouse amidships, one on each 8-inch turret and two on the 13-inch turrets apiece. Her small size and cramped decks prevented the more thorough modernization of her superstructure that the later American pre-dreadnought battleships received at this time.

On 29 August 1911, Oregon was recommissioned, but she remained assigned to the reserve fleet until October, when she got underway for San Diego, California. Over the next two years, she cruised off the West Coast but saw no events of note. She was placed "in ordinary" on 9 April 1913 in Bremerton, Washington before being formally returned to the reserve fleet on 16 September 1914, though she remained in partial commission. She was fully commissioned again on 2 January 1915 to participate in the Panama–Pacific International Exposition in San Francisco. She was again reduced to the reserve fleet on 11 February 1916, remaining there until 7 April 1917, though she was still in partial commission. This period was spent in San Francisco, and 7 April she was once again returned to full commission, the United States having entered World War I the day before. She saw no activity during the war, but she was used to escort the troop ships carrying the force for the Siberian expedition that intervened in the Russian Civil War in 1918.

After returning from Russia, Oregon was decommissioned again on 12 June 1919 before being recommissioned briefly from 21 August to 4 October. During this period, she hosted President Woodrow Wilson during a review of the Pacific Fleet when it arrived in Seattle, Washington. She was assigned the hull number of "BB-3" on 17 July 1920 when the Navy adopted the system. Beginning in 1921, a group of naval enthusiasts embarked on a campaign to have Oregon preserved as a museum ship, to be based somewhere in her namesake state. The Washington Naval Treaty, signed in 1922, required Oregon to be demilitarized, and she was accordingly disarmed in 1923, being pronounced compliant with the terms of the treaty on 4 January 1924. She was listed on the Naval Vessel Register as an "unclassified" relic. The Navy loaned the ship to Oregon in June 1925, and she was moored in Portland and restored as a museum vessel.

=== Fate ===
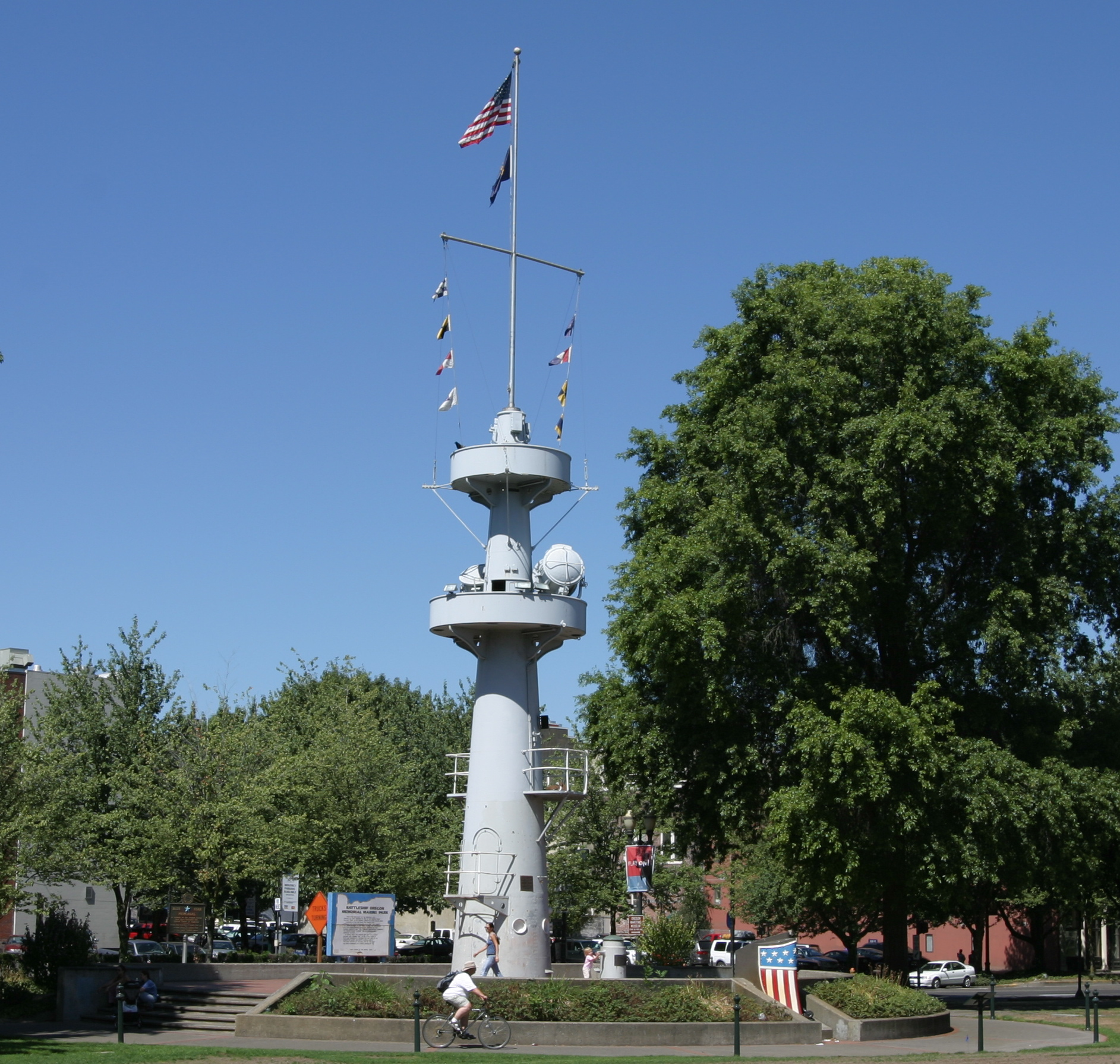
Oregon's mast in Portland, Oregon

Oregon was redesignated with the hull number IX-22 on 17 February 1941. After the United States entered World War II with the Japanese attack on Pearl Harbor on 7 December 1941, the Navy determined that Oregon ought to be sold for scrap to free resources for the war effort. She was accordingly struck from the Naval Vessel Register on 2 November 1942 and was sold to ship breakers on 7 December. In March 1943, she was towed to Kalama, Washington to be broken up, but after the work began the Navy decided that Oregon would be of use during the planned reconquest of Guam scheduled for mid-1944, either as a storage hulk or as a breakwater. The Navy requested that the breakers stop after the superstructure had been cleared and her internal fittings and equipment had been removed and to return her. She was then loaded with ammunition to support the forces that would invade Guam and towed there as part of the invasion fleet.

The vessel remained moored in Guam through the end of the war in 1945 and for several years thereafter. During this period, on the night of 14–15 November 1948, Oregon broke free from her moorings during Typhoon Agnes and drifted away. After an extensive search, aircraft located the vessel adrift some 500 nmi (930 km; 580 mi) southeast of Guam. The ship was towed back to Guam, and she remained there until 1956, when on 15 March she was sold to Massey Supply Corporation, which in turn resold her to Iwai Sanggo Company of Kawasaki, Japan. She was then towed there and broken up.

Several parts of the ship remain in Portland; her military foremast was erected in 1956 at the Tom McCall Waterfront Park and her wheel is held in the collection of the Oregon Historical Society. Both of her funnels also survive, but are not on public display.
