= Francis J. Higginson =

American naval officer

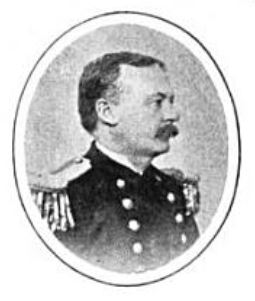
- Francis J. Higginson
- Born: July 19, 1843; Boston, Massachusetts, US
- Died: September 12, 1931 (aged 88) (Note: Some sources list Higginson's date of death as September 12, 1931 and others as September 13, 1931, but a death notice appearing in the September 14, 1931 edition of The Lewiston Daily (see The Lewistin Daily, September 14, 1931) with a dateline of September 13, 1931 states that he had died "yesterday," indicating that he died on 12 September 1931. The confusion regarding his date of death may arise from confusion over whether "yesterday" meant the day before the newspaper was published or the day before the dateline of the obituary.); Kingston, New York, US
- Burial place: Arlington National Cemetery
- Military career
- Allegiance: United States
- Branch: United States Navy
- Service years: 1861–1905
- Rank: Rear admiral
- Commands: Naval Rendezvous Boston; USS Despatch; USS Miantonomoh; USS Monocacy; Naval Training Station Newport; USS Atlanta; USS Monterey; USS Massachusetts; North Atlantic Squadron; Washington Navy Yard
- Conflicts: American Civil War Union blockade Battle of Forts Jackson and St. Philip Spanish–American War Puerto Rican Campaign
- Other work: Commander-General, Naval Order of the United States, 1917–1925

Francis John Higginson (July 19, 1843 – September 12, 1931) was an officer in the United States Navy during the American Civil War and Spanish–American War. He rose to the rank of rear admiral and was the last commander-in-chief of the North Atlantic Squadron and first commander-in-chief of the North Atlantic Fleet.

== Early life ==
Higginson was born in Boston, Massachusetts, on July 19, 1843. He was raised in Deerfield, Massachusetts.

== Naval career ==
=== Early career ===
Higginson was appointed as an acting midshipman on September 21, 1857, and entered the United States Naval Academy, from which he graduated in 1861, when he was promoted to midshipman.

=== American Civil War ===
The American Civil War broke out in April 1861, and Higginson's first assignment after graduation was to the screw frigate USS Colorado, which was operating under the command of Captain Theodorus Bailey in the West Gulf Blockading Squadron off the United States Gulf Coast as part of the Union blockade of the Confederate States of America. While aboard Colorado, Higginson was wounded on September 14, 1861, while participating in a raid against Pensacola, Florida, in which a party from Colorado captured and destroyed the schooner Judah or Judith, (Note: Sources disagree on the name of the schooner; according to Hamersly, p. 12, she was named Judith, but the USS Colorado entry in the Dictionary of American Naval Fighting Ships identifies her as Judah.) which was believed to be undergoing conversion for service as a Confederate privateer, and spiked a gun of a Confederate artillery battery at the Pensacola Navy Yard.

Detaching from Colorado in 1862, Higginson became signal midshipman and aide to Bailey aboard the gunboat USS Cayuga, and was aboard Cayuga serving in that capacity as Bailey commanded a gunboat division during the Battle of Forts Jackson and St. Philip on the Mississippi River in Louisiana on April 24, 1862. During the battle, the squadron of Rear Admiral David Glasgow Farragut passed Confederate Fort Jackson and Fort St. Philip to break through Confederate defenses on the Mississippi and move up to New Orleans, Louisiana, where Higginson participated in action against the Confederate artillery batteries at Chalmette, Louisiana, and the capture of New Orleans.

Promoted to lieutenant on August 1, 1862, Higginson became executive officer of the steamer USS Vixen in the South Atlantic Blockading Squadron and later a watch officer aboard the sidewheel steam frigate USS Powhatan during 1862. He was heavily involved in operations against the defenses of Charleston Harbor in South Carolina. On the night of September 8–9, 1863, he commanded a division of boats in an unsuccessful attack on Fort Sumter by a force of U.S. Navy and United States Marine Corps personnel under the overall command of the commanding officer of the monitor USS Patapsco, Commander Thomas H. Stevens Jr., and United States Army Brigadier General Quincy A. Gillmore commended him for his efficient service in command of picket launches operating at night inside Morris Island between Fort Sumter and Fort Gregg. He was the executive officer of the screw sloop-of-war USS Housatonic when the Confederate submarine H. L. Hunley sank her with a spar torpedo off Charleston, South Carolina, on February 17, 1864, the first time in history that a submarine sank a ship. He was executive officer of the gunboat USS Marblehead when she participated in the search for the Confederate States Navy commerce raider CSS Tallahassee in August 1864. He became executive officer of the monitor USS Passaic, and was aboard her for her bombardment of Fort Sumter in 1865.

=== Post–Civil War ===
Higginson had a tour on the staff of the U.S. Naval Academy in 1865, and later that year reported aboard the sloop-of-war USS Hartford, the flagship of the East India Squadron, as a watch officer. He was promoted to lieutenant commander on July 25, 1866, while aboard Hartford. Detaching from Hartford in 1868, he became executive officer of the receiving ship USS New Hampshire at Norfolk, Virginia, in September 1868. In December 1868 he became a watch officer aboard the flagship of the Mediterranean Squadron, the screw frigate USS Franklin, and in December 1869 he became the navigator aboard the sloop-of-war USS Richmond. He next served as executive officer of the sloop-of-war USS Shenandoah from August 1871 to July 1873.

Higginson was assigned to the U.S. Naval Academy again in September 1873, but in November 1873 reported back aboard Franklin in the European Squadron for a tour as her executive officer, just in time for orders to arrive for the European, North Atlantic, and South Atlantic squadrons to concentrate at Key West, Florida, in case the Virginius Affair that arose that month resulted in a war with Spain. It took until early February 1874 for all units of the three squadrons to arrive at Key West, by which time the crisis had passed, but the three squadrons did engage that month in the first open-ocean tactical exercises by a multi-ship force in the history of the U.S. Navy, whose training and operations – other than those in coastal waters and rivers during the Civil War – previously had been limited to single ships operating individually.

Higginson became executive officer of the monitor USS Dictator in March 1874, then became the commanding officer of the Naval Rendezvous at Boston, Massachusetts, in July 1874. In January 1875, he became executive officer of the receiving ship USS Ohio at Boston. He reported to the Torpedo School at Newport, Rhode Island, in May 1875 for instruction in the employment of torpedoes, and after completing it reported to the U.S. Navy Bureau of Ordnance in September 1875 for special duty inspecting rifle ordnance at the West Point Foundry in Cold Spring, New York. He was promoted to commander on 10 June 1876 while performing this duty.

In December 1877, Higginson was ordered to Constantinople in the Ottoman Empire, where he took command of the steamer USS Despatch, his first command at sea. He next became the first commanding officer of the new monitor USS Miantonomoh when she was commissioned in Pennsylvania in an incomplete condition on 6 October 1882. After she steamed from Philadelphia, Pennsylvania, to New York City for completion, he detached from her and on August 23, 1883, took command of the gunboat USS Monocacy in the Asiatic Squadron; under his command, Monocacy, protected American interests during the Battle of Foo Chow of August 23–26, 1884, in which the French Navy's Far East Squadron under Admiral Amédée Courbet bombarded the arsenal at Foo Chow, China, and virtually destroyed the Chinese Navy's Fujian Fleet.

In 1887, Higginson attended the Naval War College. On October 31, 1887, he became commandant of Naval Training Station Newport at Newport, Rhode Island, and while there received a promotion to captain on September 27, 1891. Higginson returned to sea when he took command of the protected cruiser USS Atlanta on December 10, 1891. After relinquishing command of Atlanta, he was placed on leave awaiting orders on May 28, 1893. After 13 months on leave, he reported for duty to Mare Island Navy Yard at Vallejo, California, on June 29, 1894. He became commanding officer of the monitor USS Monterey in February 1895, then had special duty at the New York Navy Yard in Brooklyn, New York, beginning in December 1895. He was captain of the yard there from June 1896 to July 1897, when he became commanding officer of the battleship USS Massachusetts in the North Atlantic Squadron.

=== Spanish–American War ===
In April 1898, just before the outbreak that month of the Spanish–American War, Massachusetts was still a unit of Rear Admiral William T. Sampson's North Atlantic Squadron, but in anticipation of the beginning of the war the United States Department of the Navy quickly transferred Massachusetts and a few other North Atlantic Squadron ships to a new Flying Squadron under the command of Commodore Winfield S. Schley. While Sampson and the North Atlantic Squadron focused on operations against Spain in the Gulf of Mexico and the Caribbean, Schley and the Flying Squadron operated to protect the United States East Coast from attack by a Spanish Navy squadron under the command of Vice Admiral Pascual Cervera y Topete. After Cervera's squadron arrived in the Caribbean, the Flying Squadron searched for it there. Eventually, the Flying Squadron found Cervera's ships at Santiago de Cuba and commenced a blockade of the port, soon joined by Sampson and the North Atlantic Squadron.

During the blockade, Massachusetts was among ships exchanging fire with Spanish coastal fortifications and the armored cruiser Cristóbal Colón on May 31, 1898. In mid-June 1898, the Department of the Navy abolished the Flying Squadron and returned its ships, including Massachusetts, to the North Atlantic Squadron. Massachusetts remained involved in the blockade but missed the climactic Battle of Santiago de Cuba on July 3, 1898, because she was away coaling at Guantánamo Bay. However, she returned to the waters of Santiago de Cuba on July 4, 1898, in time to fire at the disarmed Spanish cruiser Reina Mercedes while the Spanish scuttled her that day in an unsuccessful attempt to block the entrance to the harbor. After that Massachusetts operated off Puerto Rico in support of American forces invading that island, and Higginson commanded the naval escort for the expeditionary force led by Major General Nelson A. Miles that landed at Guánica, Puerto Rico, on July 25, 1898. Just before the war ended, Higginson received a promotion to commodore on August 10, 1898.

=== Later career ===
Higginson left Massachusetts after the war and became chairman of the United States Lighthouse Board on September 26, 1898; he was promoted to rear admiral on March 3, 1899, while serving on the board. Leaving the Lighthouse Board in April 1901, he became the commander-in-chief of the North Atlantic Squadron on May 1, 1901. In September 1902, he commanded the squadron during a war game in which 16 of its ships simulated an attack on U.S. Army coastal fortifications along the U.S. East Coast. Higginson was the squadron's last commander-in-chief, as it was abolished on 29 December 1902 and its ships and personnel formed the new North Atlantic Fleet. He became the new fleet's first commander-in-chief, serving in that capacity until 1903.

After relinquishing command of the North Atlantic Fleet, Higginson became commandant of the Washington Navy Yard in Washington, D.C., in July 1903. He served in that capacity until 19 July 1905, when he retired from the Navy upon reaching the statutory retirement age of 62.

== Later life ==
Upon his retirement, Higginson and his wife, the former Grace Glenwood Haldane (1854–1938), settled in Kingston, New York not far from Grace Higginson's home town, Cold Spring. He was a leader in Kingston's civic and social life. He also was chairman of the Sampson Memorial Committee, which unveiled the Sampson Memorial Window at the chapel of the U.S. Naval Academy in Annapolis, Maryland, on 16 November 1908 for Rear Admiral Sampson of Spanish–American War fame, who had died in 1902. Higginson was Commander-General of the Naval Order of the United States from 1917 to 1925.

Higginson died in Kingston on September 12, 1931. He is buried with his wife, who died in 1938, at Arlington National Cemetery at Arlington, Virginia.

== Footnotes ==
Military offices
Preceded by Norman H. Farquhar	Commander-in-Chief, North Atlantic Squadron; May 1, 1901 – December 29, 1902	Succeeded by none
Preceded by none	Commander-in-Chief, North Atlantic Fleet; December 29, 1902 – July 1903	Succeeded by Albert S. Barker
