= USS Miantonomoh (BM-5) =

Iron-hulled, twin-screw, double-turreted monitor of the Amphitrite class

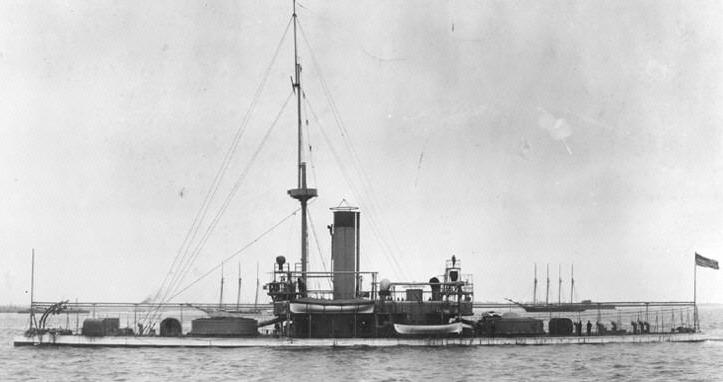
- USS Miantonomoh

History

United States
- Name: USS Miantonomoh
- Namesake: Miantonomoh (1600?-1643), a chief of the Narragansett people
- Ordered: 23 June 1874
- Builder: Delaware River Iron Ship Building and Engine Works, Chester, Pennsylvania; New York Navy Yard, Brooklyn, New York
- Laid down: 1874
- Launched: 5 December 1876
- Commissioned: 6 October 1882
- Decommissioned: 13 March 1883
- Recommissioned: 27 October 1891
- Decommissioned: 20 November 1895
- Recommissioned: 10 March 1898
- Decommissioned: 8 March 1899
- Recommissioned: 9 April 1907
- Decommissioned: 21 December 1907
- Stricken: 31 December 1915
- Fate: Sold for scrapping 26 January 1922

General characteristics
- Type: Amphitrite class monitor
- Displacement: 3,990 long tons (4,054 t)
- Length: 263 ft 1 in (80.19 m)
- Beam: 55 ft 4 in (16.87 m)
- Draft: 14 ft 6 in (4.42 m)
- Propulsion: Steam engine, 2 screws
- Speed: 10.6 knots (19.6 km/h; 12.2 mph)
- Complement: 150 officers and enlisted
- Armament: 2 × 10 in (250 mm)/31 caliber breechloader rifles; 2 × 10 in (250 mm)/34 caliber breechloader rifles; 2 × 4 in (100 mm) rifles; 2 × 6-pounder guns

The second USS Miantonomoh, an iron‑hulled, twin‑screw, double‑turreted monitor of the Amphitrite class; on June 23, 1874 by order of President Ulysses S. Grant's Secretary of Navy George M. Robeson in response to the Virginius Incident was laid down (scrapped and rebuilt) contracted by Delaware River Iron Ship Building and Engine Works of Chester, Pennsylvania; launched 5 December 1876; and commissioned in an uncompleted condition on 6 October 1882, Commander Francis J. Higginson in command.

== Service history ==
Miatonomoh steamed from Philadelphia to Washington and thence to New York where she decommissioned 13 March 1883. Completed at New York Navy Yard, Brooklyn, between 1883 and 1891, the "New Navy" monitor commissioned 27 October 1891, Captain Montgomery Sicard in command. During the next year Miantonomoh cruised the east coast between New York and Charleston. Late in 1892 she was laid up at New York, but between 1892 and 1895 she supported fleet target practice and served the naval militias of Massachusetts and Rhode Island. She decommissioned at Philadelphia on 20 November 1895.

After the sinking of the armored cruiser Maine in Havana harbor 15 February 1898, Miantonomoh recommissioned 10 March 1898, Captain Mortimer L. Johnson in command. On 21 April, the United States and Spain severed diplomatic ties, leading to the Spanish–American War. The following day, President William McKinley ordered Rear Admiral William T. Sampson to blockade ports on the northern coast of Cuba. After fitting out at Charleston, S.C., Miantonomoh joined the blockading force 5 May to serve until the blockade was lifted 14 August, the day after hostilities ceased. Miantonomoh returned to Charleston 29 August and to Philadelphia 1 October. She decommissioned at League Island 8 March 1899.

Miantonomoh remained in reserve until 1906 when she was loaned to the Maryland Naval Militia. She recommissioned at Philadelphia 9 April 1907, Chief Boatswain Eugene M. Isaacs in command. For the next several months she operated out of Norfolk and participated in the Jamestown Exposition commemorating the tercentenary of the first permanent English settlement in America. Returning to League Island 4 December, she decommissioned 21 December. Laid up at Philadelphia until 17 December 1915, Miantonomoh was then authorized for use as a target by the 5th Naval District. Her name was struck from the Navy list on 31 December 1915, and her hulk was one of several sold to Henry A. Hitner's Sons Company and W. F. Cutler of Philadelphia on 26 January 1922.
