= USS Texas (1892) =

Second-class battleship of the United States Navy

Coordinates: 37°43′10″N 76°05′00″W

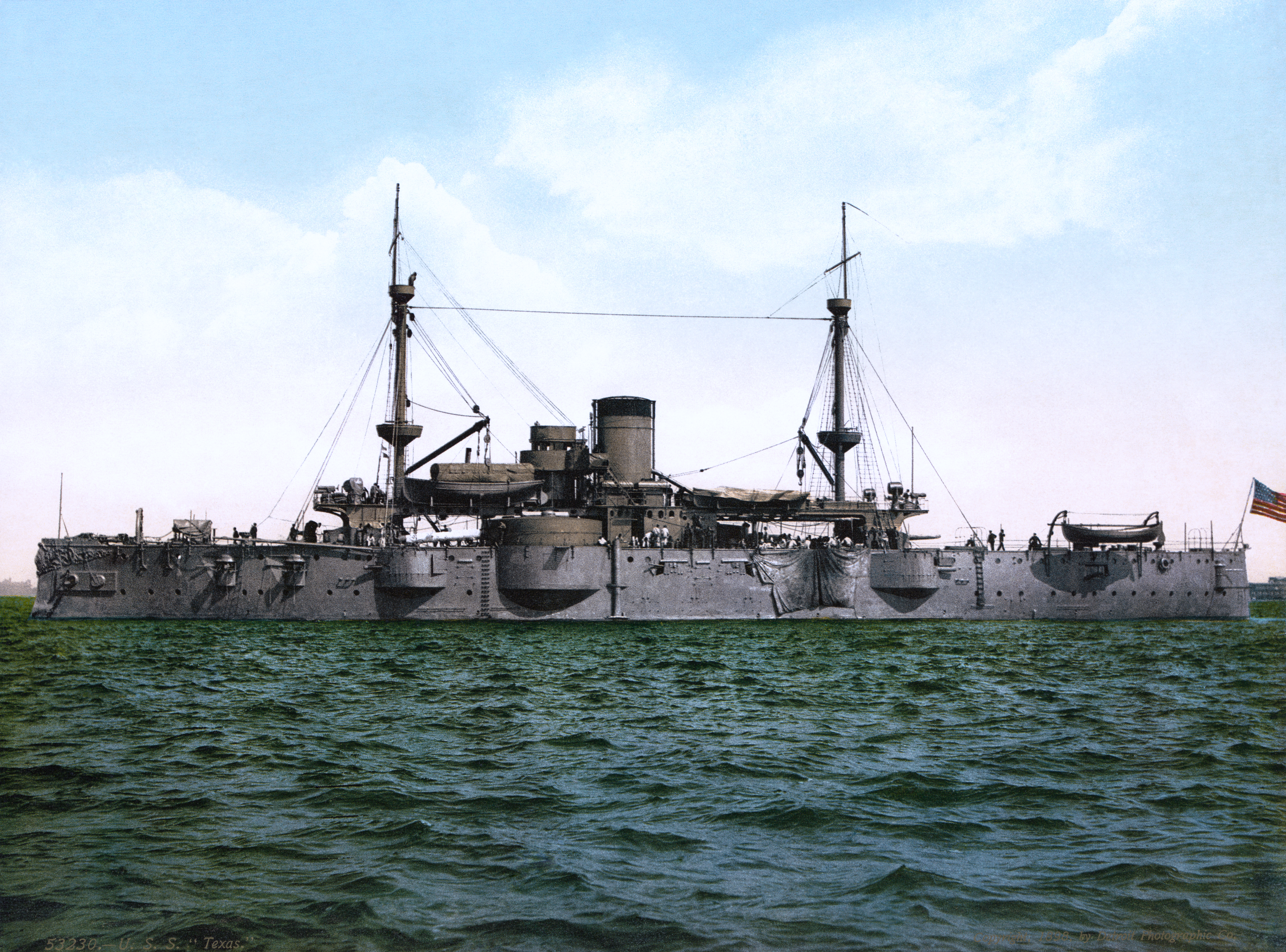
- USS Texas, photochrom print c. 1898

History

United States
- Name: Texas
- Namesake: Texas
- Ordered: 3 August 1886
- Builder: Norfolk Naval Shipyard, Portsmouth, Virginia
- Laid down: 1 June 1889
- Launched: 28 June 1892
- Commissioned: 15 August 1895
- Decommissioned: 11 February 1911
- Renamed: San Marcos, 15 February 1911
- Stricken: 10 October 1911
- Nickname(s): Old Hoodoo
- Fate: Sunk as gunnery target, 21–22 March 1911

Class overview
- Succeeded by: Indiana class

General characteristics
- Type: Pre-dreadnought battleship
- Displacement: 6,316 long tons (6,417 t) (full load) (1896)
- Length: 308 ft 10 in (94.1 m)
- Beam: 64 ft 1 in (19.5 m)
- Draft: 24 ft 6 in (7.5 m)
- Installed power: 4 × boilers; 8,610 ihp (6,420 kW)
- Propulsion: 2 × screws; 2 × triple-expansion steam engines
- Speed: 17.8 knots (33.0 km/h; 20.5 mph)
- Complement: 392 officers and men (1896)
- Armament: 2 × single 12 in (305 mm) guns; 4 × single 6 in (152 mm) guns; 2 × single 6 in (152 mm) guns; 12 × single QF 6-pdr (57 mm (2.2 in)) guns; 4 × single 1-pdr 37 mm (1.5 in) revolving guns; 6 × single 1-pdr guns; 4 × 14 in (356 mm) torpedo tubes
- Armor: Belt: 12 in (305 mm); Deck: 1–3 in (25–76 mm); Citadel: 12 in (305 mm); Turrets: 1–3 in (25–76 mm); Conning tower: 9 in (229 mm); Bulkheads: 8 in (203 mm)

USS Texas was a pre-dreadnought battleship built by the United States in the early 1890s. The first American battleship commissioned, she was built in reaction to the acquisition of modern armored warships by several South American countries, and meant to incorporate the latest developments in naval tactics and design. This includes the mounting of her main armament en echelon to allow maximum end-on fire and a heavily-armored citadel amidships to ensure defensive strength. However, due to the state of U.S. industry at the time, Texas's building time was lengthy, and by the time she was commissioned, she was already out of date. Nevertheless, she and the armored cruiser USS Maine were considered advancements in American naval design.

Texas developed a reputation as a jinxed or unlucky ship after several accidents early in her career; she consequently earned the nickname "Old Hoodoo". These mishaps included problems during construction, a grounding off Newport, Rhode Island, and flooding shortly afterwards while at dock in New York City. In the last, she settled to the bottom with her gun deck awash and several crew members drowned. She also received significant damage to her hull in drydock after being raised. Her reputation improved with her service in the Spanish–American War, when she blockaded the coast of Cuba and fought in the Battle of Santiago de Cuba.

After the war, Texas returned to peacetime duty, interrupted by several refits. She became the station ship in Charleston, South Carolina, by 1908 and was renamed San Marcos in 1911 to allow her name to be used by the new battleship BB-35. She became a target ship that same year and was sunk in shallow water in Chesapeake Bay. She was used as a gunnery target throughout World War II and was partially demolished in 1959 because her remains were considered a navigational hazard.

== Design and description ==
=== Background ===
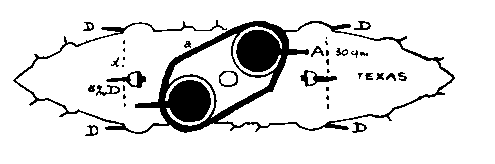
Plan view of Texas from the 1900 edition of Jane's Fighting Ships. 'A' are the main guns and 'D' shows the locations of the six-inch guns

The delivery of the Brazilian battleship Riachuelo in 1883 and the acquisition of other armored warships by Brazil, Argentina, and Chile shortly afterward alarmed the United States government, as the Brazilian Navy was now the most powerful in the Western Hemisphere. The United States Navy now felt capable only of defending its own ports. The Chairman of the House Naval Affairs Committee, Congressman Hilary A. Herbert characterized the situation thus: "if all this old navy of ours were drawn up in battle array in mid-ocean and confronted by the Riachuelo it is doubtful whether a single vessel bearing the American flag would get into port."

The Navy Advisory Board, confronted with the possibility of hostile ironclads operating off the American coast, began planning for a pair of ships to protect that coast in 1884. Both had to fit within existing docks and had to have a shallow draft to enable them to use all the major American ports and bases. They had to have a minimum speed of 17 knots (31 km/h; 20 mph) and were to displace about 6,000 long tons (6,096 t). They were both optimized for end-on fire and had their gun turrets sponsoned out over the sides of the ship and echeloned to allow them to fire across the deck, much like the battleships Riachuelo and Aquidabã. The first ship, laid down for the then-traditional cruiser mission of battleship substitute on overseas deployment and armed with four 10 in (250 mm) guns, became Maine. The other, armed with two 12 in (300 mm) guns, became Texas, the first ship named in honor of that state to be built by the United States. (Note: The Confederacy built a twin-screw ironclad named Texas during the American Civil War, but she was the first United States ship to carry the name. See DANFS Texas (1892).)

The Navy Department conducted an international design competition for Texas and the winner was the Naval Construction & Armaments Co. of Barrow-in-Furness, England. The winning design placed Texas's forward turret on the port side and her aft turret to starboard. The need for cross-deck fire caused the superstructure to be separated into three pieces to allow for each gun to fire between the sections of the superstructure. This significantly limited the gun's ability to fire to the opposite beam as the superstructure still restricted each gun's arc of fire. Furthermore, neither the deck nor the superstructure was reinforced to withstand the muzzle blast as the gun fired, as demonstrated during the Battle of Santiago de Cuba when her starboard deck was damaged.

Even five years before Texas was complete, the blast effects from end-on fire were considered prohibitive and en echelon mounting of main guns was abandoned in European navies and new American builds. This made Texas's armament arrangement obsolete. The Bureau of Construction and Repair in conjunction with the newly established Board on Construction, considered a thorough re-design which would have placed Texas's main guns on the centerline, either in two single turrets or one twin turret, and the heavy redoubt eliminated. Construction by this time was too far advanced for such a plan, however, and Navy Secretary Benjamin Tracy limited the Board to detail improvements.

=== General characteristics ===
Texas was 308 feet 10 inches (94.1 m) long overall. She had a beam of 64 feet 1 inch (19.5 m) and a maximum draft of 24 feet 6 inches (7.5 m). She displaced 6,315 long tons (6,416 t) at full load as built. Her hull had two wing compartments on each side of her machinery spaces as well as a centerline longitudinal watertight bulkhead separating the engines and boilers. Asymmetric flooding of the wing compartments posed a grave danger to her stability. Her double bottom protected most of her hull and extended up the side to the lower edge of the armor deck. She had a metacentric height of 2.54 feet (0.8 m) and was fitted with a ram bow.

=== Propulsion ===
Texas's machinery was built by the Richmond Locomotive and Machine Works of Richmond, Virginia. She had two inverted vertical triple-expansion steam engines with a total designed output of 8,610 indicated horsepower (6,420 kW), each driving one propeller shaft using steam provided by four double-ended cylindrical boilers at a working pressure of 175 psi (1,210 kPa; 12.3 kgf/cm^{2}). On trials, she reached a speed of 17.8 knots (33.0 km/h; 20.5 mph), exceeding her contract speed of 17 knots (31 km/h; 20 mph). She carried a maximum load of 877 short tons (796 t) of coal. She carried two Edison electric dynamos to power her searchlights and provide interior lighting.

=== Armament ===
Texas's main armament consisted of two 12-inch (305 mm)/35 caliber Mark I guns mounted in single Mark 2 hydraulically powered turrets inside her armored redoubt. These guns had a maximum elevation of 15° and could depress to −5°. Eighty rounds per gun were carried. They fired a 870-pound (394.6 kg) shell at a muzzle velocity of 2,100 ft/s (640 m/s) to a range of about 12,000 yards (11,000 m) at maximum elevation. The fixed rammers were below and outside the turrets. Initially, they could only be loaded at one positions, dead-ahead and at 0° elevation, but they were modified to load at all angles of train just before the start of the Spanish–American War.

Four of the six 6-inch (152 mm) guns were mounted in casemates in the hull and the other two were mounted on the main deck in open pivot positions. The two main deck guns were 35-caliber weapons, while the casemate guns were 30-caliber guns. Data is lacking, but they could probably depress to −7° and elevate to +12°. They fired shells that weighed 105 pounds (47.6 kg) with a muzzle velocity of about 1,950 ft/s (590 m/s). They had a maximum range less than 9,000 yd (8,200 m) when fired at maximum elevation.

The antitorpedo boat armament consisted of a dozen 57 mm (2.2 in) six-pounder guns (of unknown type) in casemates spaced along the hull. They fired a shell weighing about 6 lb (2.7 kg) at a muzzle velocity of about 1,765 ft/s (538 m/s) at a rate of 20 rounds per minute. Their range was less than 8,700 yd (8,000 m). Two 37 mm (1.5 in) Hotchkiss five-barrel revolving guns each were mounted on the fore and aft superstructures. In addition, two 37-mm Driggs-Schroeder one-pounder guns were mounted in each fighting top. They fired a shell weighing about 1.1 lb (0.50 kg) at a muzzle velocity of about 2,000 ft/s (610 m/s) to a range about 3,500 yd (3,200 m). They had a rate of fire of about 30 rounds per minute.

Texas carried four 14-inch (356 mm) torpedo tubes, all above water. One tube each was in the bow and stern and another on each side, towards the rear of the hull. She was originally intended to carry two small steam torpedo boats, each with a one-pounder gun, and a trainable torpedo tube, but they were cancelled after the poor performance of the boat built for the Maine.

=== Armor ===
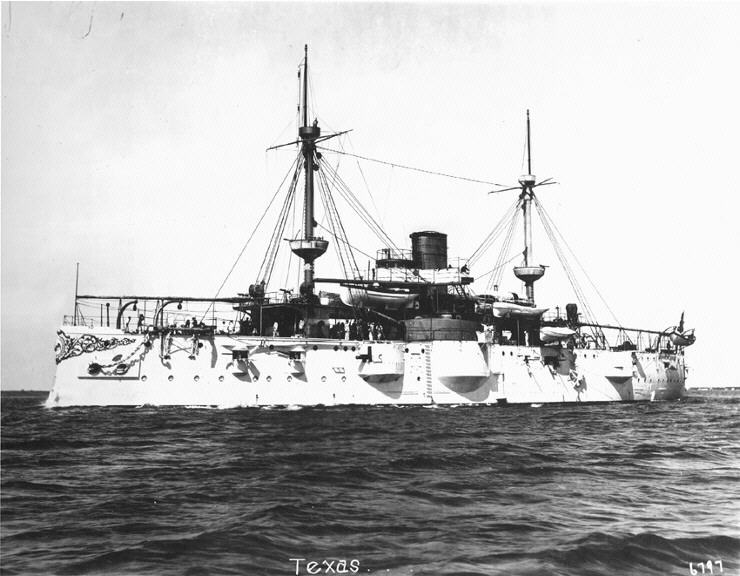
Texas prior to the Spanish–American War

The main waterline belt, made of Harvey armor, had a maximum thickness of 12 inches and tapered to 6 inches (152 mm) at its lower edge. It was 188 feet (57.3 m) long and covered the machinery spaces. It was 7 feet (2.1 m) high, of which 3 feet (0.9 m) was above the design waterline. It angled inwards for 17 feet (5.2 m) at each end, thinning to 8 inches (203 mm), to provide protection against raking fire. It sloped downwards to meet the top of the protective deck. It was 2 inches (51 mm) thick and sloped downwards at the ends of the ship. It also sloped downwards to the sides, but its thickness increased to 3 inches (76 mm). A 12-inch-thick diagonal armored citadel on the gun deck protected the turret machinery and the supports of the conning tower. The deck above it was two inches thick.

The sides of the circular turrets were 12 inches thick, and they had 1-inch-thick (25 mm) roofs. The conning tower had 9-inch (23 cm) walls. Turret hoists, voicepipes and electrical leads were protected by armored tubes. The lateral hydraulic pipes that ran along the underside of the gun deck were initially unprotected, but armored tubes were installed to protect them during Texas's 1902 refit. Along the center of the ship, they were one inch thick, but increased to two inches closer to the sides of the ship.

No light armor was fitted above the main belt or at either end of the ship. This made Texas highly vulnerable to rapid-fire guns using high-explosive shells. This was not considered a significant threat at the time Texas was designed but would become so within a few years.

== Construction ==
Texas was authorized by the U.S. Congress on 3 August 1886. The start of construction was delayed for nearly eight months over concerns about her stability and general characteristics. Her keel was laid down on 1 June 1889, at Portsmouth, Virginia, by the Norfolk Navy Yard. She was launched on 28 June 1892, sponsored by Miss Madge Houston Williams, granddaughter of Sam Houston; and commissioned on 15 August 1895, with Captain Henry Glass in command.

== Service ==
=== Early years ===
When drydocked in the New York Navy Yard for the first time after her trials several structural flaws came to light. The floors had buckled their brackets and the cement near the keel had cracked. Her floor brackets were reinforced with 4 in × 4 in (10 cm × 10 cm) angle iron and the cement was repaired. But this raised issues regarding her structural integrity so a Board of Survey in January 1896 was formed to evaluate her condition and suggest improvements. The Board determined that further strengthening of her hull was needed, but the exact measures taken are not known, although they would cost $39,450 and take 100 working days. However, the Board wished to know what effect these changes would have on the draft, stability, and metacentric height of the Texas. The Board received a reply on 4 February that they would increase her displacement by 31 long tons (31 t), deepen her draft by less than 2 in (51 mm) and raise her metacentric height to 2.76 ft (0.84 m).

The ship ran aground near Newport, Rhode Island, in September 1896. Operator error combined with signal failure were blamed. A few officers, including future Governor of Guam Alfred Walton Hinds, were publicly reprimanded. While under repairs in New York, the yoke that secured the main injection valve in the starboard engine room broke on 9 November 1896. Water pressure unseated the valve and allowed the compartment to flood as the receiving pipe had earlier been removed for repair. Leaks in the watertight doors, voicepipes and holes in the bulkheads for electrical cables allowed the flooding to spread to the other engine and boiler rooms, the coal bunkers adjacent to them, as well as most of the magazines and shell rooms. The ship settled to the bottom, but the water was so shallow as to aid salvage efforts. By the 11th most of the water had been pumped out, but she was still drawing too much water to enter the drydock. An estimated 300 short tons (270 t) of coal would have to be removed to lighten Texas enough to enter the drydock.

After repairs Texas was assigned to the North Atlantic Squadron, and patrolled the Eastern Seaboard of the United States. In February 1897, she left the Atlantic for a brief cruise to the Gulf coast ports of Galveston, Texas, and New Orleans. She arrived in Galveston on 16 February 1897 and anchored in 6 fathoms (36 ft; 11 m) of water. The local pilot assured her captain that this was the best berth in the harbor for a ship of Texas's length. However a strong tide swung her around onto a mud bank and held there. She was not able to get herself off and even the assistance of the U.S. Revenue Steamer Galveston was to no effect. Late the next day she was hauled off by the use of her port anchor and a tug. These two incidents gave her a reputation as being a jinxed or unlucky ship and earned her the nickname "Old Hoodoo".

She returned to the Eastern Seaboard in March 1897 and remained there until the beginning of 1898. During this period, her bow and stern torpedo tubes were removed in June 1897 and additional telescopic sights were added to her turret roofs between 14 July and 12 August. At the beginning of 1898, she visited Key West, Florida, and the Dry Tortugas en route to Galveston for a return visit, which she made in mid-February. Returning to the Atlantic via the Dry Tortugas in March, she arrived in Hampton Roads on 24 March and resumed duty with the North Atlantic Squadron.

=== Spanish–American War ===
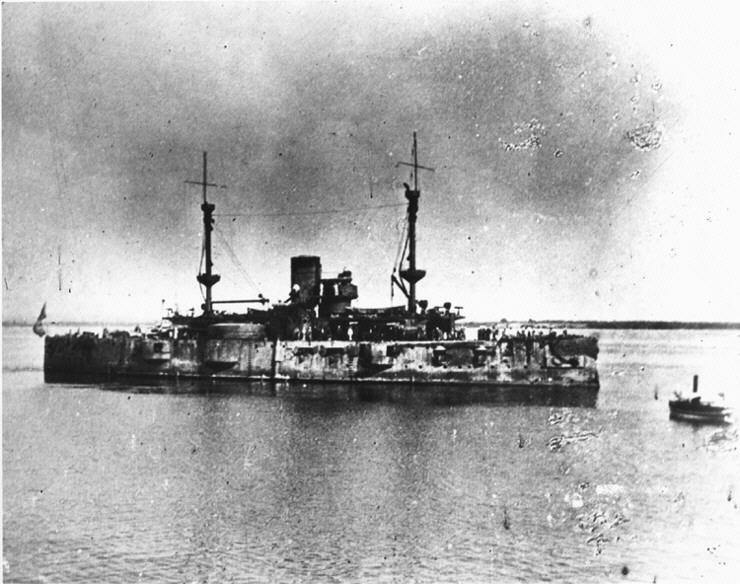
Texas in Cuban waters, May–July 1898

Early in the spring, war between the United States and Spain erupted over conditions in Cuba and the supposed Spanish destruction of Maine in Havana harbor in February 1898. By 18 May, under the command of Captain J. W. Philip, Texas was at Key West, readying to prosecute that war.

On 21 May, the battleship arrived off Cienfuegos, Cuba, with the Flying Squadron to blockade the Cuban coast. After a return to Key West for coal, Texas arrived off Santiago de Cuba on 27 May. She patrolled off that port until 11 June, when she made a reconnaissance mission to Guantánamo Bay in support of the Marine landings there. The next day the Texas landed three field pieces and two M1895 Colt–Browning machine guns at the request of the Marine expeditionary commander, Lt. Col. Robert W. Huntington. (Note: The USS Texas landed three field pieces and two additional M1895 Colt–Browning machine guns on 12 June, the latter procured from the ship's own armory. See Venzon 1992, p. 8) For the next five weeks, the Texas patrolled between Santiago de Cuba and Guantánamo Bay. On 16 June, the warship joined the cruiser Marblehead for a bombardment of the fort on South Toro Cay in Guantánamo Bay. The two ships opened fire just after 14:00 and ceased fire about an hour and 16 minutes later, having reduced the fort to impotency.

On 3 July, she was steaming off Santiago de Cuba when the Spanish Fleet under Admiral Cervera attempted to escape past the American Fleet. Texas took four of the enemy ships under fire immediately. While the battleship's main battery pounded the armored cruisers Vizcaya and Cristobal Colon, her secondary battery joined Iowa, Gloucester, and Indiana in battering two torpedo-boat destroyers.

"The two Spanish destroyers fell out of the action quickly and beached themselves, damaged heavily. One by one, the larger enemy warships also succumbed to the combined fire of the American Fleet. Each, in turn, sheered off toward shore and beached herself. Thus, Texas and the other ships of the Flying Squadron annihilated the Spanish Fleet." Texas was lightly damaged during the battle by a single 6 in (152 mm) high explosive shell that hit her on the starboard side above the main deck, immediately forward of the ash hoist. Fragments from the shell badly damaged the ash hoist and destroyed the doors of both air shafts and the adjacent bulkheads. Splinters riddled much of the adjacent structure as well.

"The defeat of Cervera's Fleet helped to seal the doom of Santiago de Cuba. The city fell to the besieging American forces on 17 July, just two weeks after the great American naval victory. The day after the surrender at Santiago, Spain sought peace through the good offices of the French government. Even before the peace protocol was signed in Washington, DC, on 12 August, American ships began returning home. Texas arrived in New York on 31 July. Captain Philip was promoted to Commodore on 10 August 1898."

"In late November, Texas moved south to Hampton Roads where she arrived on 2 December. The warship resumed her peacetime routine patrolling the Atlantic coast of the United States. Though her primary field of operations once again centered on the northeastern coast, she also made periodic visits to such places as San Juan, Puerto Rico, and Havana, Cuba, where her crew could view some of the results of their own ship's efforts in the recent war."

=== Post-war service ===
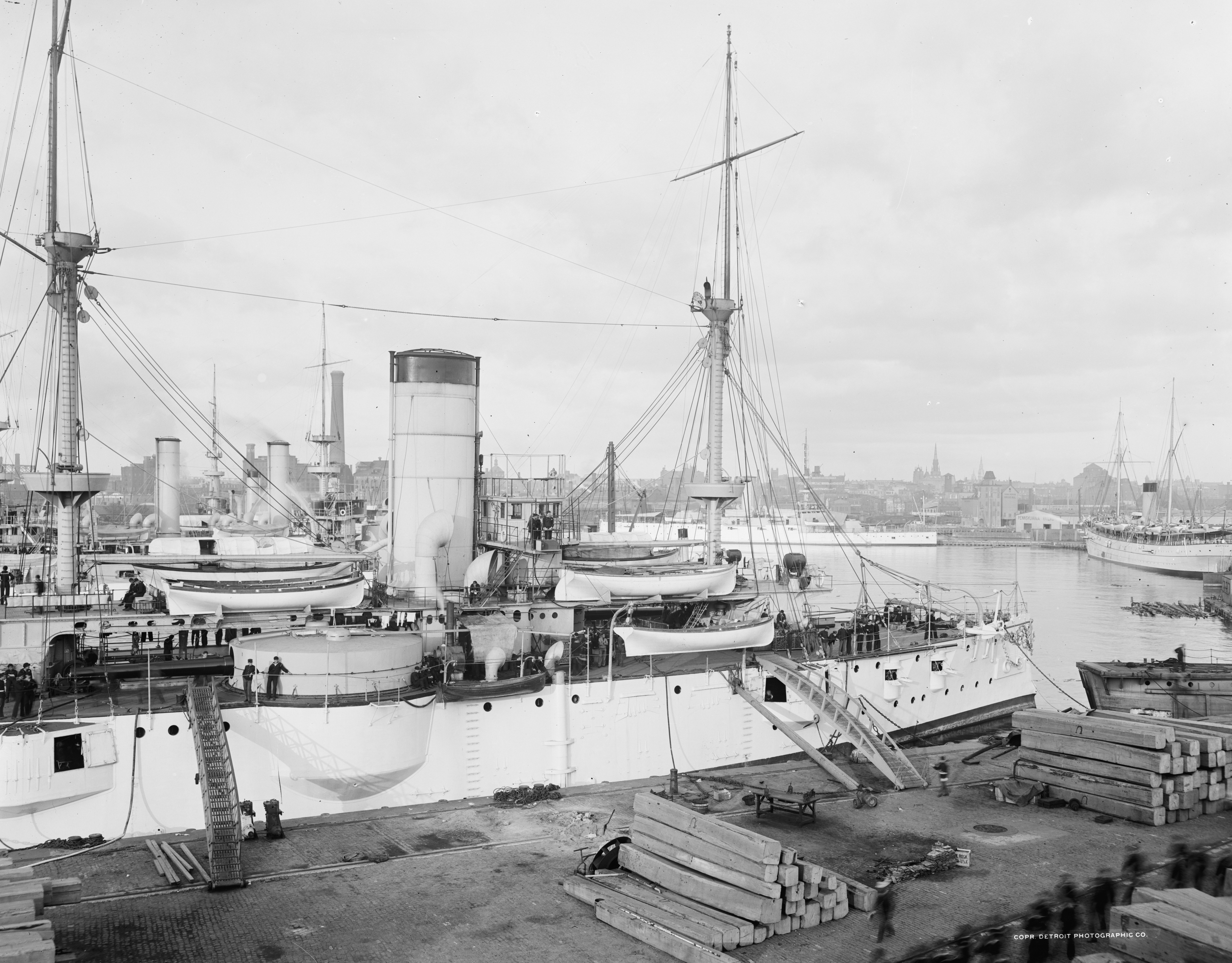
USS Texas at Brooklyn Navy Yard circa 1903

Texas was decommissioned for a lengthy refit on 3 November 1900 at the Norfolk Navy Yard but was commissioned again on 3 November 1902. During this refit, her funnel and topmasts were raised. Furthermore, the protection for her 12 in (300 mm) ammunition hoists was doubled and her broadside torpedo tubes were removed. On one voyage to New Orleans in February 1904, Texas could only make 13.9 knots (25.7 km/h; 16.0 mph) under forced draft. During 1904 her armament was upgraded when she exchanged her four 6 in (150 mm)/30 cal guns for more powerful 35-caliber weapons and two one-pounder guns were landed. She served as flagship for the Coast Squadron until 1905, and remained assigned to it after its commander shifted his flag.

Texas was briefly decommissioned between 11 January 1908 and 1 September 1908. By 1908 she had become the station ship at Charleston, South Carolina. By 1910, she had lost her 37 mm (1.5 in) revolving cannon and one more one-pdr gun in exchange for two additional six-pounder guns. Regarded as obsolete by 1911, she was relegated for use as a gunnery target to allow the Navy to evaluate the effects of modern shells on armored and unarmored parts of the ship, the probabilities of underwater hits and their depths, the effects of shock loads on pipes, etc., the flammability of the ship's fittings and the direction in which shells were pointing when striking at long range. As part of this evaluation, she was fully fitted out and only items which normally would have been allowed to be removed before action and those items added to her for service as a station ship were removed. Dummies were also rigged to evaluate the effects of hits on the crew. It is uncertain if her ammunition and powder remained on board for the tests. Preparing Texas for these tests cost $29,422.70.

=== San Marcos ===
"On 15 February 1911, her name was changed to San Marcos to allow the name Texas to be assigned to Battleship No. 35." She was sunk in shallow water in Tangier Sound in Chesapeake Bay on 21–22 March 1911 by gunfire from the battleship New Hampshire. No detailed examination was made afterward, but it was noted that there were so many holes below the waterline that the water in the forward and rear compartments generally took on the motion of the outside water. The interior above the waterline was generally demolished. She was used as a target for a torpedo experiment on 6 April. "On 10 October 1911, her name was struck from the Naval Vessel Register." A cage mast, a duplicate of those used on the Florida-class dreadnoughts, was built atop the San Marcos's remains in 1912 and tested against 12-inch (305 mm) shells fired by the monitor Tallahassee from a range of 1,000 yards (910 m) on 21 August 1912. Although the mast had been knocked down by nine hits, it was considered to have withstood the fire exceedingly well.

San Marcos was used for gunnery practice throughout World War II, although generally as an anchor for a canvas target screen. Sitting two to six feet below the surface and marked by an unlit buoy, she was responsible for the sinking of the cargo ship Lexington in 1940 following a collision. Tons of explosives were used to demolish her upperworks and drive her hull deep into the mud; by January 1959, they were successful and she remains there today.

== Gallery ==
USS Texas at Grant's Tomb, 3 September 1898

== Bibliography ==
=== Print sources ===
- Alden, John D. (1989). American Steel Navy: A Photographic History of the U.S. Navy from the Introduction of the Steel Hull in 1883 to the Cruise of the Great White Fleet. Annapolis, Maryland: Naval Institute Press. ISBN 978-0-87021-248-2.
- Allen, Francis J. (1993). ""Old Hoodoo": The Story of the U.S.S. Texas". Warship International. XXX (3). Toledo, Ohio: International Naval Research Organization: 226–256. ISSN 0043-0374.
- Friedman, Norman (1985). U.S. Battleships: An Illustrated Design History. Annapolis, Maryland: Naval Institute Press. ISBN 978-0-87021-715-9.
- Reilly, John C.; Scheina, Robert L. (1980). American Battleships 1896–1923: Predreadnought Design and Construction. Annapolis, Maryland: Naval Institute Press. ISBN 978-0-87021-524-7.
- Sieche, Erwin F. (1990). "Austria-Hungary's Last Visit to the USA". Warship International. XXVII (2): 142–164. ISSN 0043-0374.
- Venzon, Anne, ed. (1992). General Smedley Darlington Butler: Letters of a Leatherneck 1898–1931. Greenwood. ISBN 978-0-275-94141-3.

=== Online sources ===
- "Texas". Dictionary of American Naval Fighting Ships. Navy Department, Naval History and Heritage Command.
- "United States of America 12"/35 (30.5 cm) Mark 1 and Mark 2". NavWeaps.com. 19 September 2008.
- "United States of America 6"/30, 6"/35 and 6"/40 (15.2 cm) Marks 1, 2, 3, 4 and 7". NavWeaps.com. 25 December 2008.
- "United States of America 6-pdr (2.72 kg) [2.244" (57 mm)] Marks 1 through 13". NavWeaps.com. 6 April 2008.
- "United States of America 1-pdr (0.45 kg) [1.46" (37 mm)] Marks 1 through 15". NavWeaps.com. 15 August 2008.
- "The Accident to the Texas: Capt. Glass Held Wholly Irresponsible for the Trouble" (PDF). The New York Times. 21 October 1896.
- | Deck Log of the USS Texas, National Archives, Washington D.C.
