= USS Iowa (BB-4) =

Pre-dreadnought battleship of the United States Navy

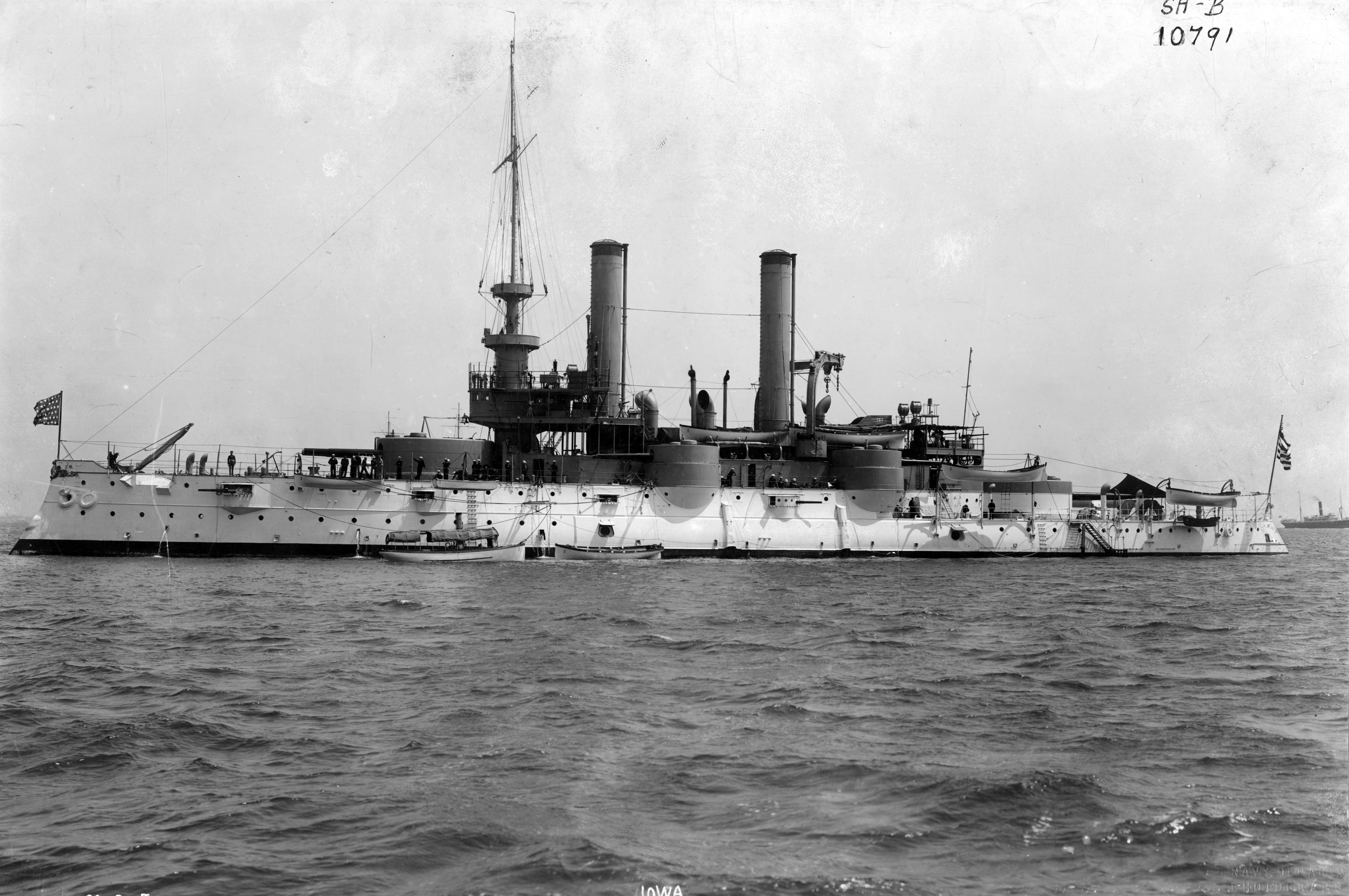
- Iowa early in her career

History

United States
- Name: Iowa
- Namesake: Iowa
- Builder: William Cramp & Sons, Philadelphia
- Laid down: 5 August 1893
- Launched: 28 March 1896
- Commissioned: 16 June 1897
- Decommissioned: 30 June 1908
- Recommissioned: 2 May 1910
- Decommissioned: 23 May 1914
- Recommissioned: 23 April 1917
- Decommissioned: 31 March 1919
- Stricken: 27 March 1923
- Fate: Sunk as a target ship, 23 March 1923

Class overview
- Preceded by: Indiana class
- Succeeded by: Kearsarge class

General characteristics
- Type: Pre-dreadnought battleship
- Displacement: Normal: 11,410 long tons (11,590 t); Full load: 12,647 long tons (12,850 t)
- Length: 360 ft (110 m) (lwl); 362 ft 6 in (110.49 m)(loa)
- Beam: 72 ft 3 in (22.02 m)
- Draft: 24 ft (7.3 m)
- Installed power: 5 × fire-tube boilers; 11,000 ihp (8,200 kW)
- Propulsion: 2 × triple-expansion steam engines; 2 × screw propellers
- Speed: 16 kn (30 km/h; 18 mph)
- Range: 5,140 nmi (9,520 km; 5,920 mi) at 10 kn (19 km/h; 12 mph)
- Complement: 36 officers; 540 enlisted men
- Armament: 4 × 12 in (305 mm)/35 caliber guns; 8 × 8 in (203 mm)/35 cal guns; 6 × 4 in (102 mm)/40 cal guns; 20 × 6-pounder guns; 4 × 1-pounder guns; 4 × M1895 Colt–Browning machine guns; 2 x 14-inch (356 mm) torpedo tubes
- Armor: Belt: 14–4 in (356–102 mm); Barbettes: 15–12.5 in (381–318 mm); Turrets : 15–17 in (432 mm); Conning Tower: 10 in (254 mm); Deck: 3 in (76 mm)

USS Iowa was a pre-dreadnought battleship built for the United States Navy in the mid-1890s. The ship was a marked improvement over the previous Indiana-class battleships, correcting many of the defects in the design of those vessels. Among the most important improvements were significantly better seaworthiness owing to her greater freeboard and a more efficient arrangement of the armament. Iowa was designed to operate on the high seas, which had been the impetus to increase the freeboard. She was armed with a battery of four 12-inch (305 mm) guns in two twin-gun turrets, supported by a secondary battery of eight 8-inch (203 mm) guns.

Upon entering service in June 1897, Iowa conducted training operations in the Atlantic Ocean before moving to the Caribbean in early 1898 as tensions between the United States and Spain over Cuba grew, leading to the Spanish–American War. The ship took part in the bombardment of San Juan, Puerto Rico, and then participated in the blockade of Cuba during the war, and after the Spanish cruiser squadron was found in Santiago de Cuba, she patrolled off the harbor to block their escape. In the Battle of Santiago de Cuba on 3 July, Iowa assisted in the destruction of three of the four Spanish cruisers. After the war, Iowa spent the next several years conducting routine training exercises, serving with the Pacific Squadron from 1898 to 1902, the South Atlantic Squadron until 1904, and the North Atlantic Squadron until 1906, when the latter two units were merged to form the Atlantic Fleet.

Iowa was modernized between 1908 and 1910; she thereafter served as a training ship for naval cadets from the United States Naval Academy and for naval militia crews. Removed from service in 1913 and decommissioned in 1914, she was reactivated after the United States entered World War I in April 1917, initially serving as a receiving ship and then as a training vessel and guard ship. She was decommissioned again in 1919, renamed Coast Battleship No. 4, and converted into a radio-controlled target ship. She was used in bombing experiments off the Virginia Capes in 1921 before being sunk as part of Fleet Problem I off the coast of Panama in March 1923 by the battleship USS Mississippi.

== Design ==
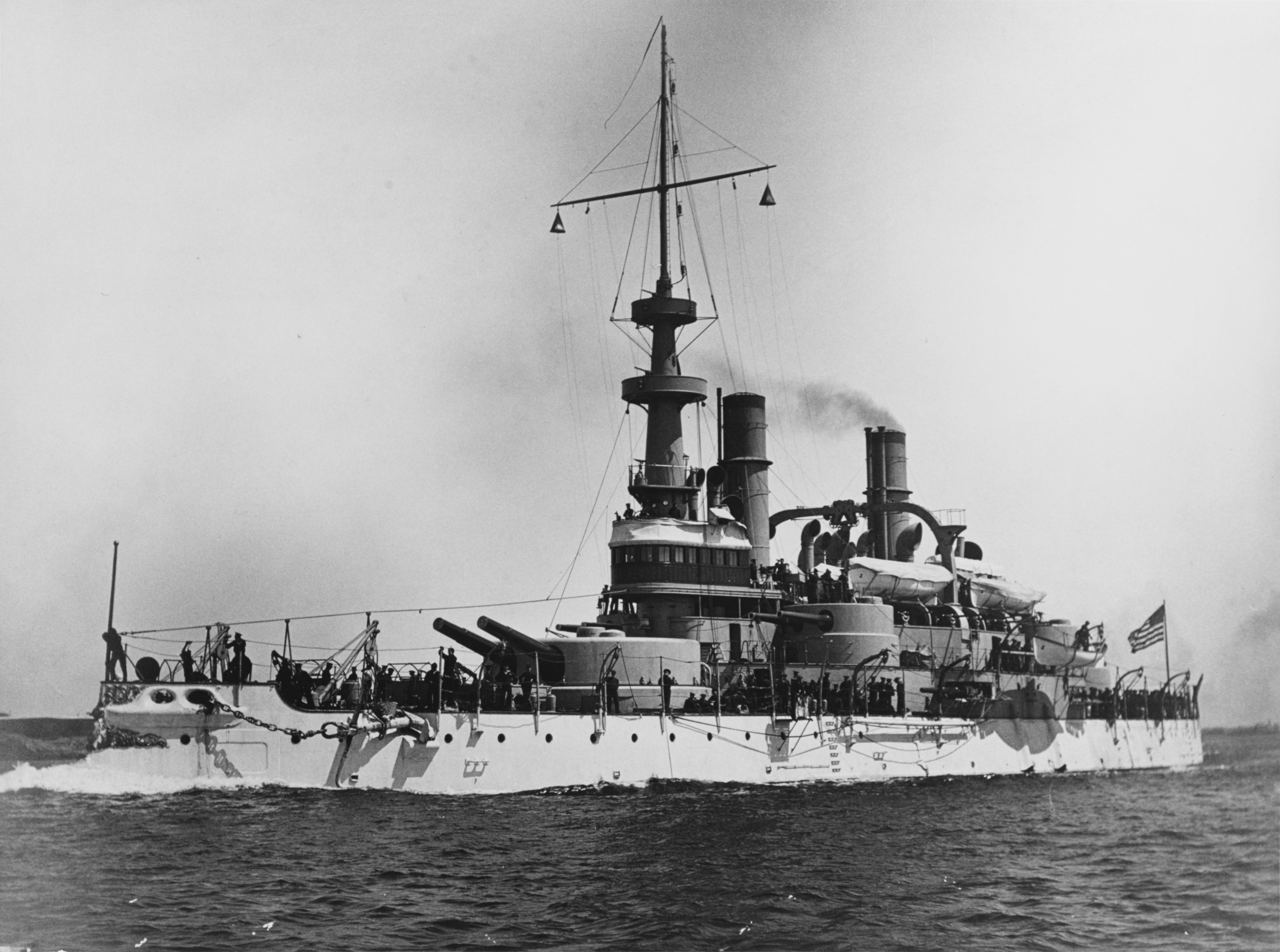
The low-freeboard Indiana-class design

In the early 1880s, the United States Navy began to grapple with the question of coastal defense; the United States at that time had a significant isolationist streak and naval strategy had historically been grounded in commerce raiding. After building the interim armored vessels USS Texas and Maine, the navy requested funding for additional ships in 1887, and one vessel was authorized for the following year. Conflicting ideas about the vessel that would be built delayed construction and led the Secretary of the Navy, Benjamin F. Tracy, to convene a Policy Board in January 1890. Tracy wanted to build sea-going battleships that could project American naval power overseas, though significant elements in the Navy and the United States Congress preferred shallow-draft coastal-defense ships.

The Board concluded that the distance between Europe and North America would hamper European naval attacks, but the power of the British Royal Navy and the possibility of future political developments warranted the construction of a powerful American battle fleet. The Policy Board issued a call for a fleet that would consist of eight first-class battleships, ten slightly smaller second-class battleships, and five third-class ships, along with substantial numbers of lesser craft to support them. The fleet would be tasked with defending the East Coast of the United States, which required an operational range that could cover as far south as the Caribbean Sea, as the Board had determined that any hostile power would need to seize advance bases there to effectively operate against the United States. The three vessels already authorized—Maine, Texas, and what became the armored cruiser New York fit in the third category, so larger and more powerful vessels would have to be built to meet the Board's recommendations.

Congress, dismayed by the Board's conclusions, nevertheless approved funding for three of the first-class battleships in April 1890, which became the Indiana-class battleships. These were low-freeboard vessels intended for local, coastal defense. They were badly overweight when completed, and as a result suffered from serious problems, including belt armor that was fully submerged when the ships were fully loaded, a tendency to ship excessive amounts of water, and poor handling characteristics. Changes in the control of Congress in late 1890 led to delays for the next ship to be authorized until 19 July 1892, when funds were allocated for a "seagoing coastline battleship". The vessel was to be built with a displacement of around 9,000 long tons (9,100 t).

The Policy Board had intended in its original plan that the seagoing ship would trade armor for greater range, but the Bureau of Construction and Repair, responsible for the design of the vessel, decided to reduce the gun armament compared to the Indianas to free up displacement for greater fuel storage. The 13-inch (330 mm) main battery of the Indiana class would be replaced with 12-inch (305 mm) guns, while some of the 6-inch (152 mm) secondary guns would be replaced with faster-firing 4-inch (100 mm) quick-firing guns. Weight would also be saved by the adoption of Harvey armor, which was significantly more effective than compound armor; a thinner belt could thus be used to achieve the same level of protection. The intention to use the new ship for long-range deployments required other changes, in addition to increased coal storage. Since the vessel would necessarily have to operate on the high seas, seaworthiness would have to be improved. This required a greater freeboard, so the ship that was to become Iowa was given a raised forecastle deck that extended from the bow to amidships. The hull was lengthened and displaced more than the Indianas. In addition, the heavy 8-inch gun turrets were moved closer together amidships, which reduced the amount of weight toward the ends of the ship, also contributing to improved sea-keeping. The arrangement also reduced blast interference between the 8-inch and the 12-inch guns.

=== General characteristics and machinery ===
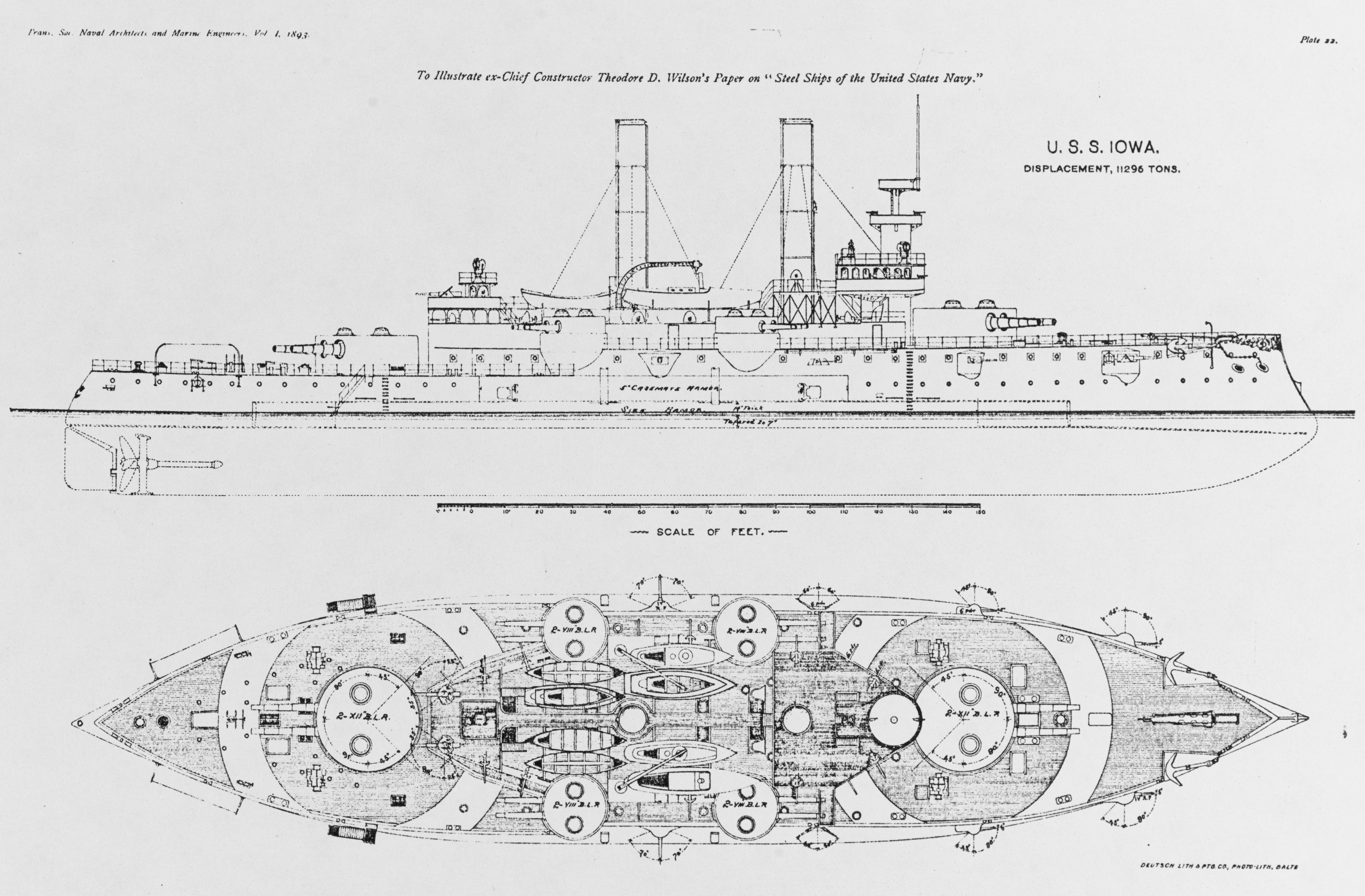
Top and profile illustration of the Iowa design

Iowa had a length at the waterline of 360 feet (110 m) and an overall length of 362 feet 5 inches (110.46 m). Her beam measured 72 feet 3 inches (22.02 m) and she had an average draft of 24 feet (7.3 m). She had a metacentric height of 4.01 feet (1.22 m) and a righting arm of 2.23 feet (0.68 m). She displaced 11,410 long tons (11,590 t) as designed and up to 12,647 long tons (12,850 t) at full load. Steering was controlled with a single rudder; while steaming at 10 knots (19 km/h; 12 mph), she could make a 180-degree turn in 550 yards (500 m), and at a speed of 14 knots (26 km/h; 16 mph), she could make the turn in 390 yards (360 m).

Her hull featured a tumblehome shape, the only time an American battleship was designed that way. She was fitted with a ram bow, a customary feature of capital ships of the period. It had much greater freeboard than the Indianas, providing her with significantly better sea-keeping qualities. She was completed with a single heavy military mast fitted with fighting tops, which was placed atop the forward conning tower. A large derrick was placed abreast the aft funnel to handle the boats carried aboard. She had a crew of 36 officers and 540 enlisted men.

The ship was powered by a pair of 3-cylinder, vertical triple-expansion steam engines that each drove a screw propeller. Steam was provided by five coal burning fire-tube boilers; three were double-ended boilers while the other two were single-ended versions. The boilers produced steam at 160 pounds per square inch (1,100 kPa). They were ducted into a pair of very tall funnels; these were adopted to improve draft to the boilers. Like the Indiana class, Iowa was fitted for forced draft, and she had mechanical hoists to remove ash from the boiler rooms. The propulsion system was rated to produce 11,000 indicated horsepower (8,200 kW) for a top speed of 16 knots (30 km/h; 18 mph), though on speed trials she reached 11,834 ihp (8,825 kW) and a maximum speed of 17.09 knots (31.65 km/h; 19.67 mph). Coal storage amounted to 1,650 long tons (1,680 t). At a speed of 10 knots, she could steam for 5,140 nautical miles (9,520 km; 5,920 mi).

=== Armament ===
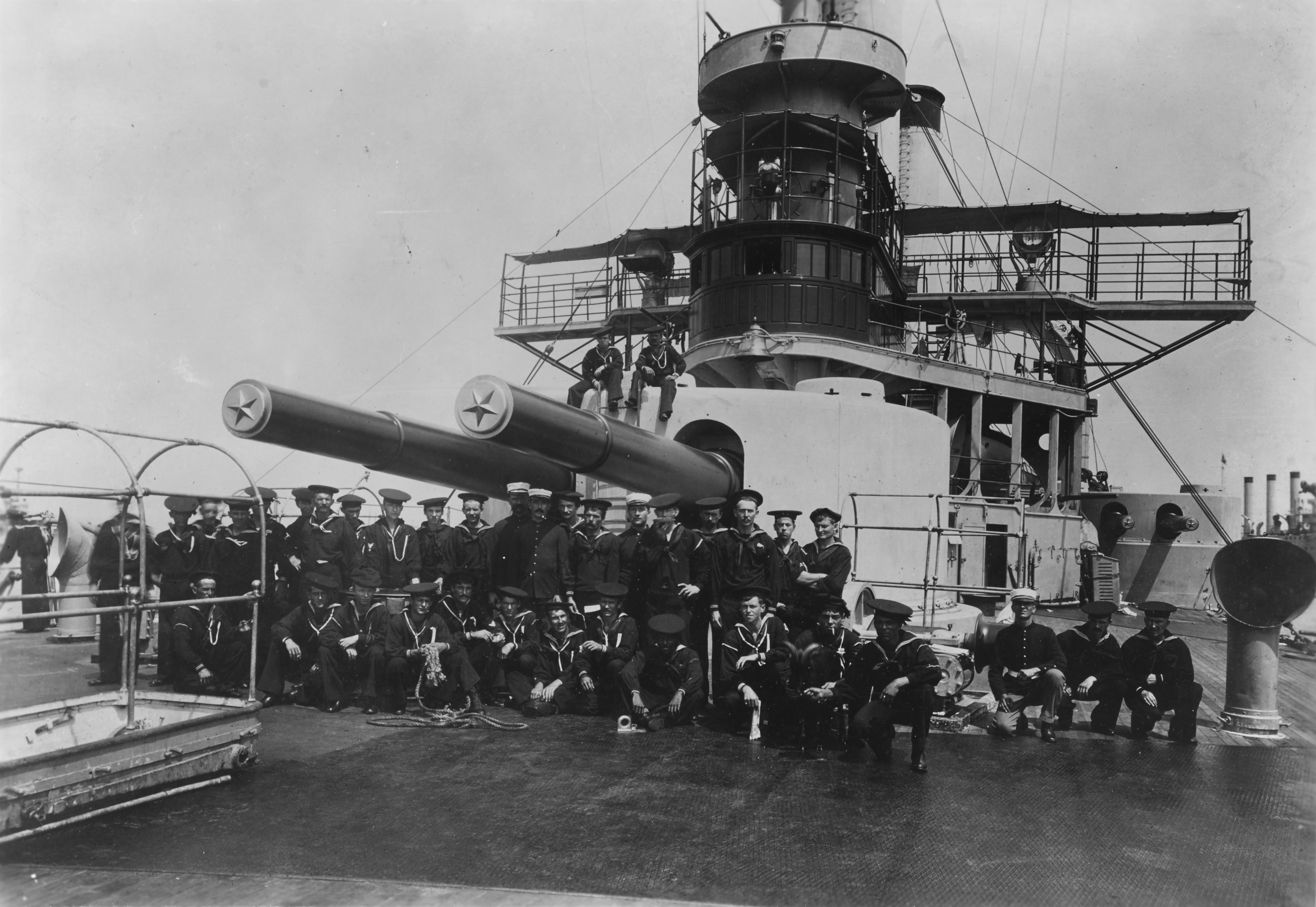
Iowa's forward main battery turret; one of her secondary turrets is visible at right

Iowa was armed with a main battery of four 12 in (305 mm)/35 caliber guns mounted in two twin-gun turrets that were mounted on the centerline, one forward and the other aft of the superstructure. The built-up guns were the Mark II type, which were placed in elliptical Mark III turrets. The training gear was hydraulically operated, but elevation was hand-operated only. The gun mounts allowed elevation to 14 degrees and depression to −5 degrees; to reload the guns, they had to be returned to 3 degrees elevation. The ammunition hoists that retrieved shells and propellant charges from the magazines were also hydraulically operated. The guns fired an 850 lb (390 kg) shell with a 425 lb (193 kg) charge of brown powder. Muzzle velocity was 2,100 ft/s (640 m/s), and at the muzzle, the shells could penetrate up to 24 in (610 mm) of mild steel; at a range of 2,500 yd (2,300 m), their penetration capability fell to 19 in (483 mm). The average rate of fire was one shot every five minutes, though fresh, well-trained crews could achieve rates as fast as one shot every three minutes.

The primary armament was supported by a secondary battery of eight 8 in (203 mm)/35 cal guns that were carried in four twin-gun wing turrets. Two were placed on either side of the ship, abreast of the funnels. Since the 12-inch guns had a long reloading time, the 8-inch guns were incorporated to increase the number of weapons that could defeat light armor. The 8-inch guns were the Mark IV version, which had a rate of fire of one shot per minute. They had a muzzle velocity of 2,080 ft/s (630 m/s), firing 250 lb (110 kg) armor-piercing shells. They were initially supplied with brown powder charges, but after the advent of smokeless powder, new, smokeless charges were adopted that increased the rate of fire by twenty seconds. Mounted in Mark VIII turrets with a range of elevation from −7 to 13 degrees, reloading was fixed at 0 degrees.

Six 4 in (102 mm)/40 cal quick-firing guns rounded out the secondary battery; these were intended to use their high rate of fire, coupled with high-explosive shells to damage unarmored parts of enemy warships. Four of these were placed in individual casemates in the forecastle deck, two in sponsons in the bow and the other two located amidships. The remaining two guns were in open shielded mounts on the aft superstructure, superfiring over the rear main battery turret. They fired a 33 lb (15 kg) high-explosive shell at a muzzle velocity of 2,000 ft/s (610 m/s). For defense against torpedo boats, the ship carried a battery of twenty 57 mm (2.2 in) 6-pounder Hotchkiss guns and four 37 mm (1.5 in) 1-pounder guns These guns were dispersed around the ship in a variety of individual mounts, including in the fighting top of the military mast, the superstructure, and in sponsons in the hull. She also carried four M1895 Colt–Browning machine guns chambered in 6mm Lee Navy.

As was standard practice for capital ships of the era, Iowa carried four above-water, 14-inch (356 mm) torpedo tubes in her hull, two on each broadside. These launched the Howell torpedo, which had a range of 400 yards (370 m) and traveled at a speed of 25 knots (46 km/h; 29 mph). They carried a 400 lb (180 kg) warhead.

=== Armor ===
Iowa was protected with Harvey armor, which was fabricated with a new type of process that produced steel that was significantly stronger than traditional compound armor. The main armor belt was 14 in thick in the central portion, where it protected the magazines and propulsion machinery spaces. It extended from 3 ft (0.91 m) above the waterline and 4 ft 6 in (1.37 m) below the line, and it extended for a length of 186 ft (57 m) of the hull. The belt tapered to 7 in (178 mm) at the lower edge. At either end of the belt, angled bulkheads that were 12 in thick connected the belt to the barbettes for the main battery turrets. She had a 2.75 in (70 mm) thick armor deck that was level with the top edge of the belt. On either end of the belt, the deck sloped down on the sides and was increased slightly to 3 in (76 mm) to provide the bow and stern with a measure of protection against light guns. Above the belt was a thinner strake of armor that was 5 in (127 mm) thick where it protected the 4-inch guns and reduced to 2 in (51 mm) where it covered the 57 mm and 37 mm guns.

Iowa's main battery turrets were protected with 15 in (381 mm) on the sides and 2 in thick crowns; the rears of the turrets were 17 in (432 mm) thick, with the greater weight being used to balance the turret. Their barbettes were also 15 in thick on the exposed sides and reduced to 12.5 in (318 mm) where it was protected by the belt. The secondary turrets had 8 in on the outboard sides and 6 in (152 mm) on the inboard sides, where they were less vulnerable. They also had 2-inch roofs. Their barbettes were 8 in thick. Her conning tower had 10 in (254 mm) thick sides.

== Service history ==
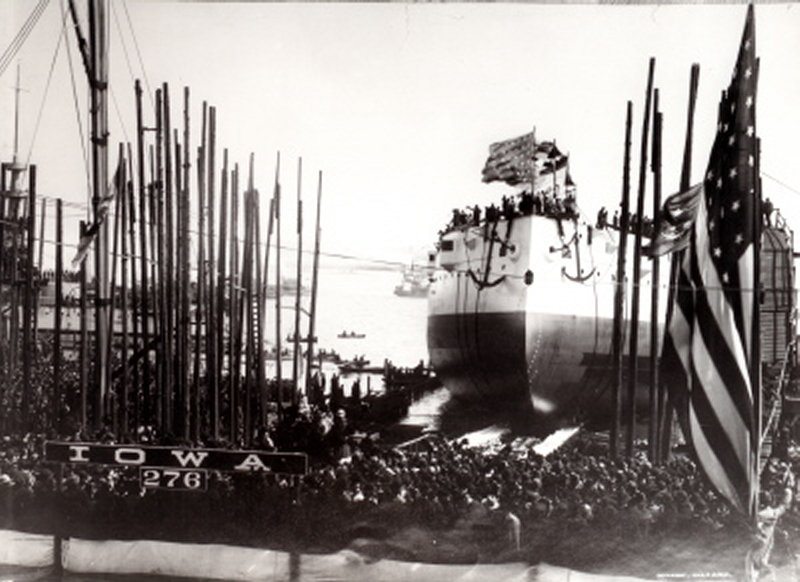
Iowa at her launching on 16 June 1897

The keel for Iowa was laid down on 5 August 1893 at the William Cramp & Sons shipyard in Philadelphia. Her completed hull was launched on 28 March 1896, and after completing fitting out, the vessel was commissioned into service on 16 June 1897. Captain William T. Sampson served as the ship's first commanding officer. Iowa got underway to begin her shakedown cruise on 13 July, steaming first to Newport, Rhode Island from 16 July to 11 August, moving to Provincetown, Massachusetts the next day. She next departed on 14 August for Portland, Maine, where she stayed from 16 to 23 August, before sailing for Bar Harbor, Maine the next day, where she spent the rest of the month. She then steamed south to Virginia, visiting Hampton Roads from 12 to 16 September, Newport News from 16 to 19 September, a second stop at Hampton Roads from the 16th to the 19th, and finally Yorktown from 27 September to 4 October. Iowa then sailed back north for a second visit to Provincetown that lasted from 12 to 14 October and then moved to Boston, staying there from 15 to 22 October.

She made one last port call, in Tompkinsville, New York, from 24 to 29 October, before entering the New York Navy Yard for repairs that lasted from 29 October to 5 January 1898. After emerging from the dry dock, Iowa sailed for Virginia, alternating between Hampton Roads and Newport News through mid-January, before departing for Key West, Florida. She then spent the next month and a half cruising between Key West and the Dry Tortugas to the west. During this period, Maine exploded and sank in Havana, Cuba; the accidental explosion was initially blamed on a deliberately detonated Spanish naval mine. Sampson was appointed to serve as President of the Board of Inquiry that was sent to investigate the sinking, so Captain Robley D. Evans took his place as Iowa's commander on 24 March. The ship remained in the Florida Keys through 22 April, by which time the Spanish–American War had broken out.

=== Spanish–American War ===
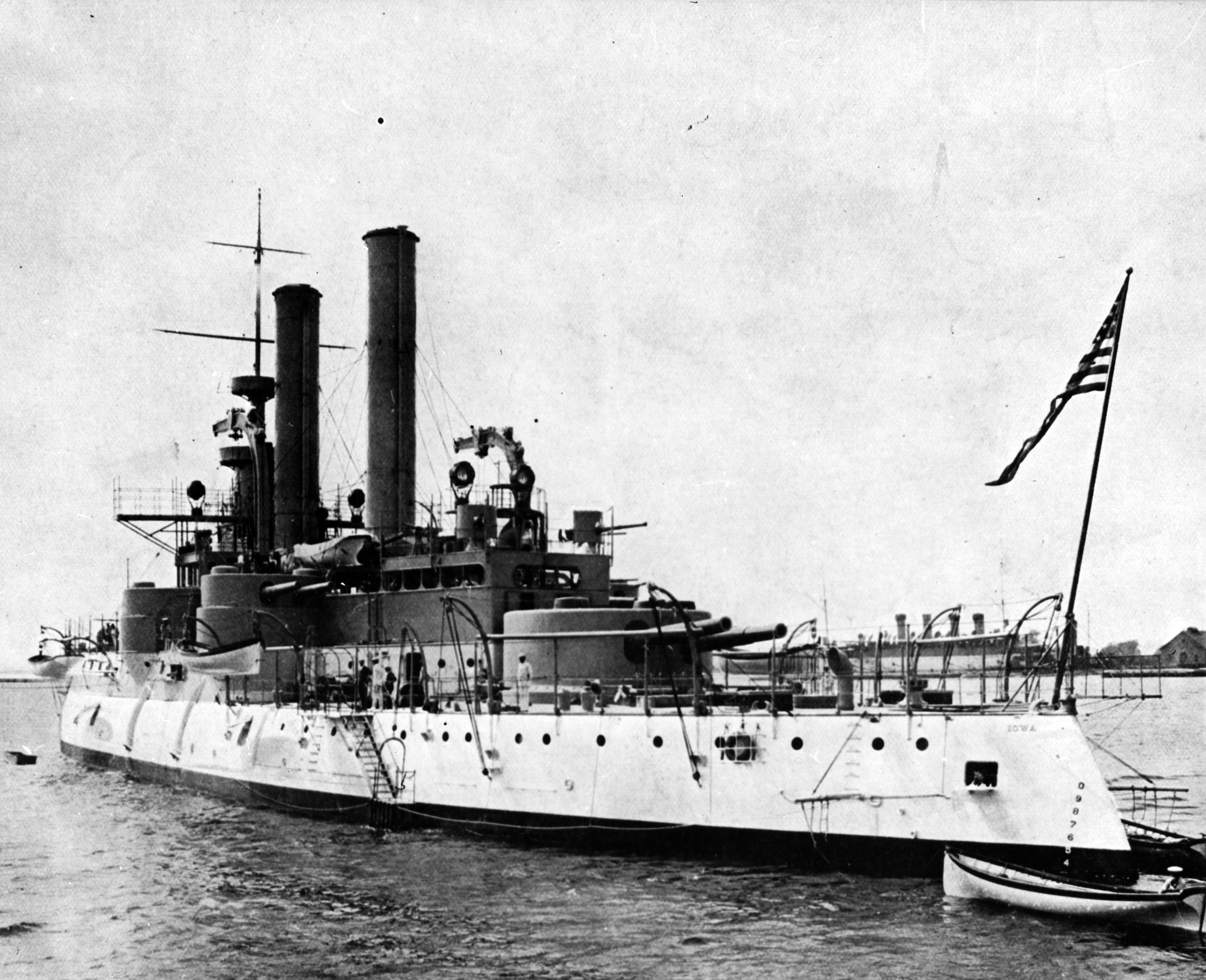
Iowa seen from the stern, c. 1898

On 22 April, President William McKinley declared a blockade of western Cuba and three days later, Congress declared war on Spain, retroactively effective as of 21 April. Sampson had by this time taken command of the North Atlantic Squadron, which Iowa joined; she took part in the blockade operation from 22 April to 1 May before returning to Key West to replenish fuel. By that time, Sampson had been informed that a Spanish squadron of four armored cruisers and three torpedo boats commanded by Rear Admiral Pascual Cervera y Topete had crossed the Atlantic to attack the blockade squadron; he gathered his ships on 4 May to search for them. Sampson had at his disposal his flagship, New York, Iowa, Indiana, and the unprotected cruiser Detroit, and these ships were soon reinforced by the unprotected cruiser Montgomery and the monitors Amphitrite and Terror, and later the armored cruiser Brooklyn.

The Americans searched the harbor at Puerto Rico on 12 May, but found no Spanish warships, and so bombarded the port, focusing their fire on Castillo San Felipe del Morro, an old coastal fortress. Iowa led the American line of battle on several passes in front of the fort, and she was struck once by a Spanish shell that wounded three men and inflicted minor splinter damage to the ship. During her last 12-inch salvo, one of her forward guns inflicted blast damage to the deck and parts of the superstructure. One man was killed aboard Brooklyn and three more were wounded aboard other vessels, but none of the ships was seriously damaged by Spanish fire; American shelling was equally ineffective. Assuming that Cervera was headed for Havana, Sampson took his squadron there, but while en route he learned that the Spanish had been coaling in Saint Thomas in the Danish West Indies. Sampson instead decided to take his ships back to Key West, arriving there on 18 May, while Cervera reached Santiago de Cuba the following day. Sampson detached Iowa to reinforce the Flying Squadron under Commodore Winfield Scott Schley, which was conducting the blockade of Cuba. She joined the squadron off Cienfuegos on 22 May.

The Flying Squadron, which by then consisted of Iowa, Texas, the battleship Massachusetts, New York, Brooklyn, the unprotected cruiser Marblehead, and several gunboats, auxiliary cruisers, and supporting vessels, spent the next week patrolling off the coast of Cuba, searching for Cervera's squadron. On the morning of 29 May, lookouts aboard Marblehead reported spotting the Spanish cruiser Cristóbal Colón in the roadstead outside Santiago de Cuba. The American squadron converged on the port over the next two days and prepared for action; Iowa coaled at sea on 30 May during this period. Schley made an initial attack on the afternoon of 31 May; he led the line with his flagship Massachusetts, followed by the protected cruiser New Orleans, and then Iowa on a pass in front of Cervera's ships, opening fire at long range at 14:05. The American shells fell short and they gradually shifted their fire, but they failed to score any hits, though Evans noted that he believed they had inflicted splinter damage. Spanish return fire was similarly inaccurate, and both sides had checked fire by 15:10, by which time the American ships had broken off.

The next day, Sampson arrived on the scene and boarded New York to take command of the blockade. The approach to Santiago de Cuba was guarded by coastal artillery and mines, which prevented Sampson's ships from breaking into the inner harbor without taking serious damage. But the American squadron was too powerful for the Spanish to attempt to break out. Both sides spent the next month in the resulting stalemate; the Americans preferred to wait until ground forces could attack the port from the land side and seize the coastal batteries. During this period, Iowa withdrew to Guantánamo Bay from 18 to 28 June, which had been seized by American forces by that time. She returned to bombard the coastal fortifications on 1 and 2 July in company with Indiana and the battleship Oregon. By early July, American troops were beginning to approach the hills outside Santiago de Cuba, threatening the coastal batteries that protected Cervera's ships, and prompting the Spanish command to order him to attempt a break out. Cervera did not believe he possessed a significant chance of success, as his ships were in poor condition by that time and most of his ships' crews were poorly trained. He nevertheless complied with the directive and sent a gunboat to surreptitiously clear a path in the minefield on the night of 2 July.

==== Battle of Santiago de Cuba ====
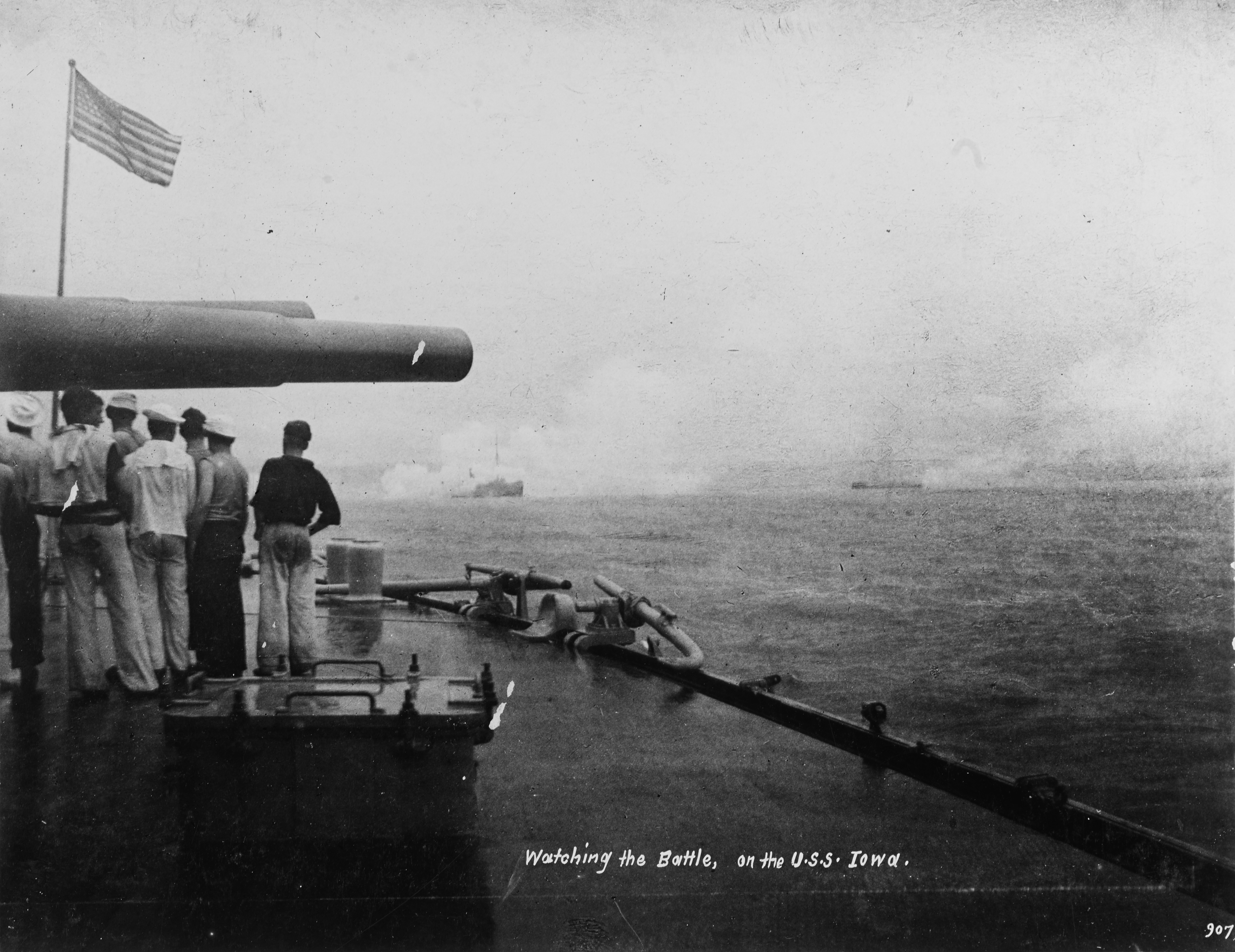
Iowa's crewmen watch the U.S. fleet's gunfire during the Battle of Santiago de Cuba.

At 08:45 on 3 July, Cervera sortied with his flag aboard the cruiser Infanta Maria Teresa, followed by Cristóbal Colón, Vizcaya and Almirante Oquendo and the destroyers Plutón and Furor. Iowa was in her blockade station, steaming at about 5 knots (9.3 km/h; 5.8 mph) when her men were called from their quarters for the morning inspection at 09:15. The Spaniards cleared the roadstead at 09:35; luckily for the Spanish, New York was out of position at the time and Massachusetts was replenishing her coal at Guantánamo Bay. Toward the end of inspection aboard Iowa, lookouts aboard Brooklyn spotted Cervera approaching and fired one of her guns to warn the other American ships, which quickly ordered their crews to general quarters. As the Spanish ships attempted to break out to the west, Cervera charged at Brooklyn with Infanta Maria Teresa to delay the American pursuit and give his other ships time to escape. The Spanish coastal batteries also contributed their fire in the first stage of the battle but had little effect.

Iowa, Brooklyn, and Texas opened fire at about 09:40 at a range of about 6,000 yards (5,500 m). Iowa quickly got steam in her boilers up to increase speed to close with the fleeing cruisers; the range fell steadily until she was just 2,500 yards (2,300 m) away from Infanta Maria Theresa. Iowa fired a broadside at the cruiser and then turned to port to cross the t of Vizcaya, though the Spanish cruiser turned to avoid the maneuver. Iowa nevertheless fired a broadside at a range of 1,800 yards (1,600 m) before turning to port and then back to starboard to come alongside Cristóbal Colón. The two ships were about 1,400 yards (1,300 m) apart and Iowa's entire battery opened fire, enveloping her in thick black smoke and hampering her gunners' ability to spot targets. Cristóbal Colón and Almirante Oquendo engaged Iowa, and one of the vessels struck her with what was estimated to be a 6-inch (152 mm) shell. It failed to explode, but still tore a large hole in the side of her hull. A second shell from one of the cruisers struck Iowa and exploded, causing relatively minor damage and starting a fire that was quickly put out. Several small shells struck her upper works, including her bridge and funnels, but the damage inflicted was minimal.

By this point in the battle, heavy American gunfire had set Infanta Maria Theresa on fire, and, fearing a magazine explosion, Cervara ordered her run aground at 10:25. Almirante Oquendo's captain issued similar instructions five minutes later, as his ship, too, was burning badly. Vizcaya was also forced ashore shortly thereafter, but her flag remained flying, so Iowa continued to bombard the vessel until she hauled it down at 10:36, a sign of surrender. Meanwhile, the two Spanish destroyers had also been badly damaged by the American battleships; Indiana had nearly cut Plutón in half with a 13-inch shell, forcing her to run aground, where she exploded. And Furor had been savaged by Iowa's, Oregon's, and Indiana's secondary batteries, leading her crew to surrender to the gunboat Gloucester. Cristóbal Colón managed to break away from the American fleet for a time, but she also ran aground later in the day.

At around 11:00, Iowa lowered five of her cutters to pick up the crews of the wrecked cruisers. Among the men rescued was Captain Antonio Eulate, Vizcaya's commander; he attempted to surrender his sword to Evans, but he returned it to Eulate. In total, Iowa picked up 23 officers and 248 enlisted men, of whom 32 were wounded. Her crew also recovered the bodies of five men who were then buried with military honors. In addition, Iowa's boats also transferred men to other vessels in the American fleet. On 20 July, four days after the Spanish garrison at Santiago de Cuba surrendered, Iowa suffered a boiler accident while she was patrolling off the city. The manhole gasket on one of her boilers blew out, sending boiling water out into the boiler room. The crew set a board across a bucket and Fireman 2nd Class Robert Penn climbed across to shut off the boiler, risking being badly burned, and he was later awarded the Medal of Honor for his actions.

=== 1898–1904 ===
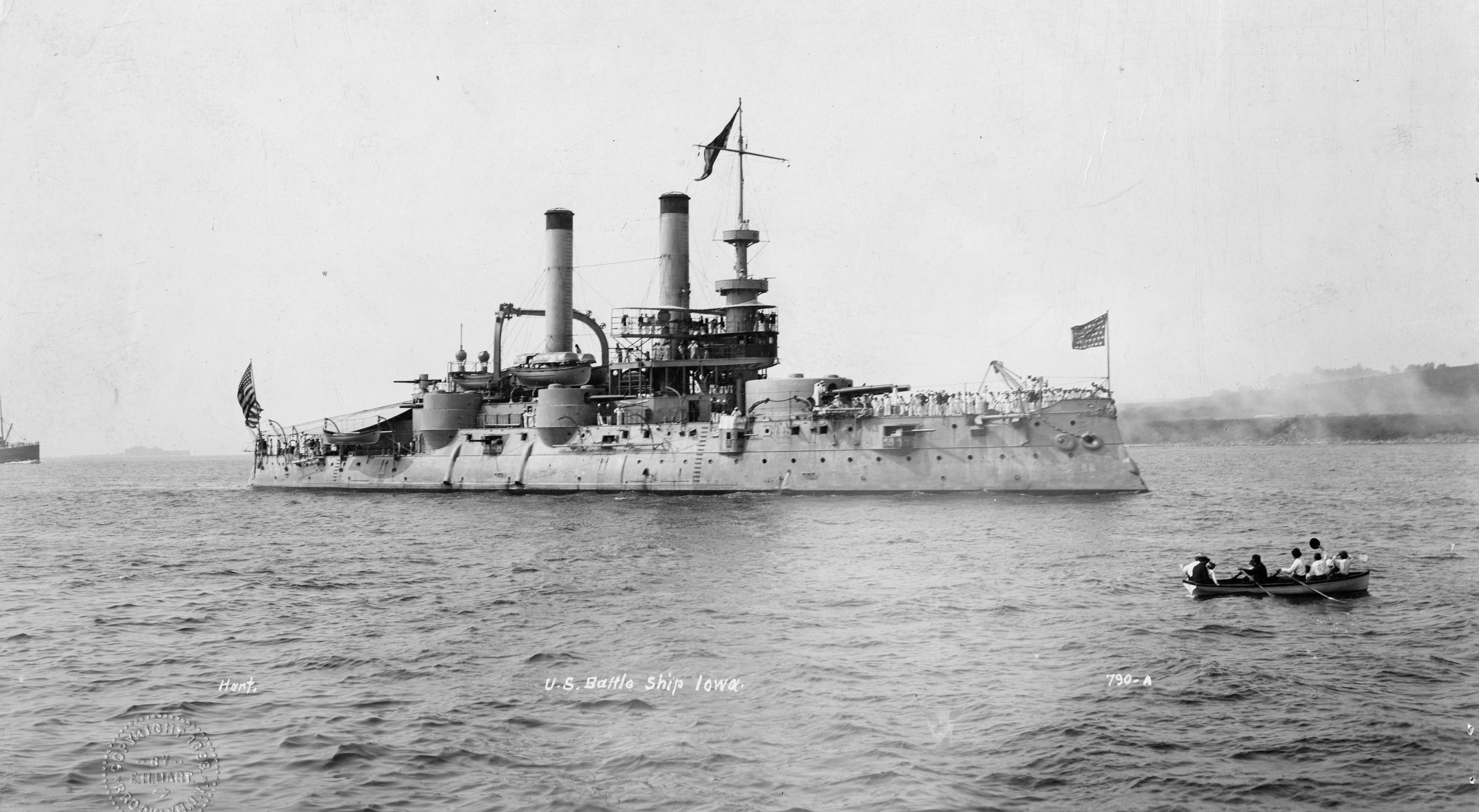
Iowa at the naval review held to celebrate the American victory

Iowa left Cuban waters after Spain surrendered in August, arriving in New York on 20 August. Captain Silas Terry took command of the ship on 24 September and on 12 October, she departed for the West Coast of the United States, where she was to join the Pacific Squadron. The next year passed uneventfully and Iowa put into the Puget Sound Navy Yard for an overhaul that began on 11 June 1899. She took part in training exercises off San Diego, California from 20 December to 15 January 1900. On the first day of the exercises, Iowa lost one of her Howell torpedoes after the practice warhead likely detached after it was launched. In March 2012, a pair of dolphins that were part of the Navy's Marine Mammal Program recovered the torpedo, which was missing the practice warhead; the section recovered was later transferred to the Underwater Archaeology Branch for preservation. The torpedo is one of three Howell torpedoes known to exist. During the period in San Diego, she received a pair of 3-inch field guns and four M1895 Colt-Brownings that were chambered in .30-40 Krag for use by landing parties ashore. After the training exercises, Iowa underwent a refit, after which she resumed her peacetime routine of training exercises, shooting practice, and cruises in the eastern Pacific. Captain Philip H. Cooper took command of the ship on 9 June, serving as her commander until 1 April 1901. On 8 September, the sailing ship May Flint collided with her while she was at anchor in San Francisco Bay and then collided with a barque and sank.

In early February 1902, she was transferred to the South Atlantic Squadron to serve as its flagship. During this period, she visited a number of foreign ports, including Montevideo, Uruguay from late July to 2 August, Santos, Brazil from 6 to 7 August, Salvador, Brazil from 11 August to 8 September, Trade Island from 8 to 14 September, Montevideo again from 22 to 28 September, Puerto Belgrano, Argentina from 28 September to 19 October, Montevideo a third time from 22 October to 6 November, and Rio de Janeiro, Brazil from 10 to 18 November. From there, she steamed north to the West Indies, stopping in the Gulf of Paria from 29 November to 4 December. She then took part in a search exercise off Mayagüez, Puerto Rico from 9 to 10 December. She then joined maneuvers off Culebra, Puerto Rico between 11 and 19 December, before steaming to visit Saint Lucia on 21 December. The next day, she traveled to Port of Spain, Trinidad, where she stayed until 28 December. Iowa returned to Culebra on 30 December and lay there through 1 February 1903. The ship visited St. Kitts from 2 to 6 February and Ponce, Puerto Rico from 6 to 11 February before turning north for New York the next day. She took an indirect route, visiting Galveston, Texas, from 18 to 26 February and Pensacola, Florida, from 28 February to 1 April. She took part in shooting practice there from 1 to 9 April, during which one of her main battery guns exploded. She underwent repairs at the Pensacola Navy Yard from 9 to 23 April, and then resumed her voyage northward. She reached Cape Henry, Virginia, staying there from 28 to 30 April, then Tompkinsville from 1 to 7 May; she finally reached the New York Navy Yard later on 7 May. She was decommissioned there on 30 June.

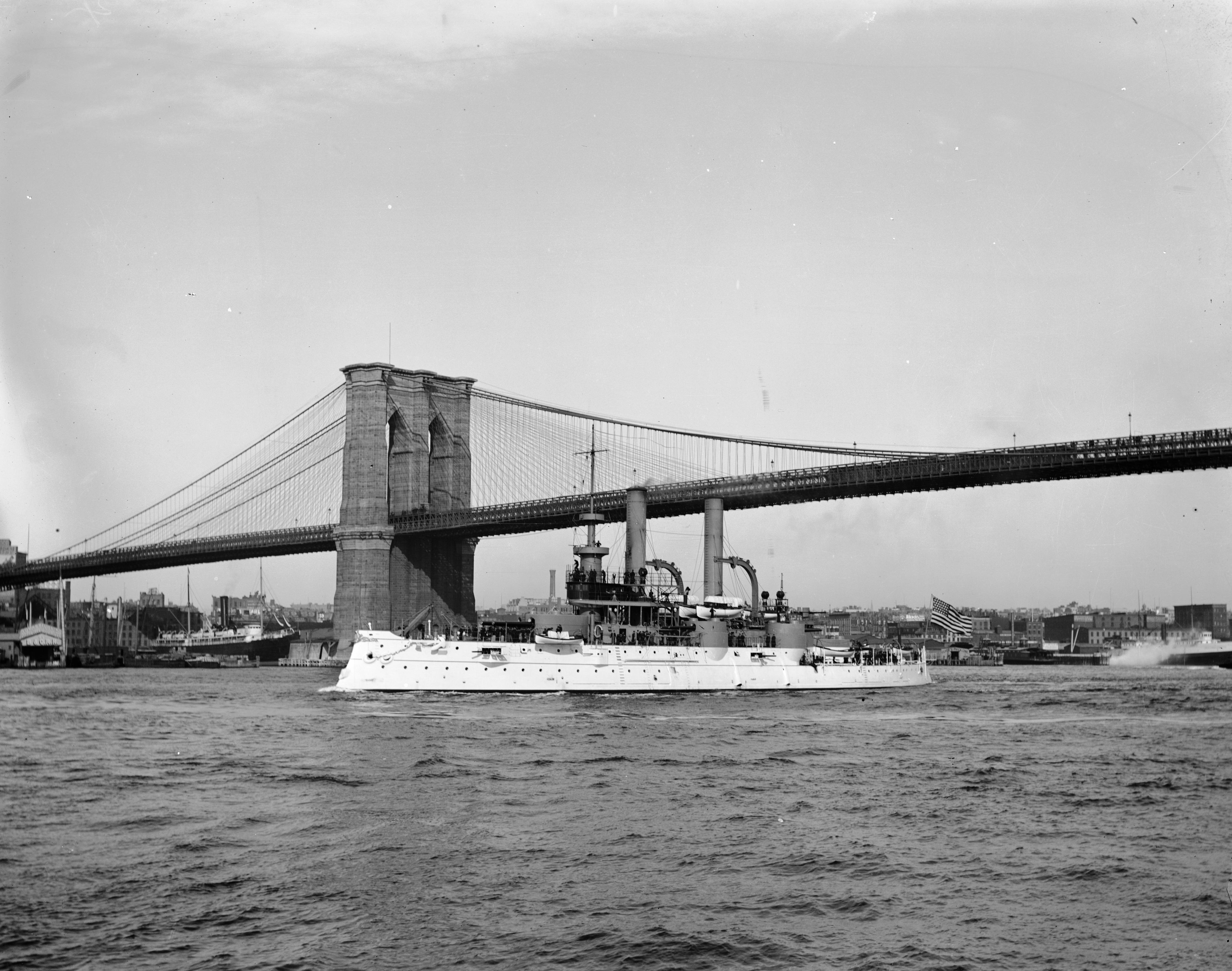
Iowa passing under the Brooklyn Bridge

On 23 December, Iowa was recommissioned and underwent a refit that included replacing the 4-inch guns on her aft superstructure with a pair of 6-pounder guns in early January 1904. She then joined the North Atlantic Squadron, which was then in European waters. She visited Piraeus, Greece, from 30 June to 6 July, the island of Corfu from 8 to 9 July, and then Trieste and Fiume in Austria-Hungary for the rest of the month. On 2 August, she crossed the Adriatic to Palermo, Italy, staying there for three days before getting underway for Gibraltar, which she visited from 9 to 13 August. She then re-crossed the Atlantic, stopping in Horta in the Azores from 18 to 20 August. The ship reached Menemsha, Massachusetts on 29 August and stayed there until 5 September, waiting for her turn at the Navy's target range off Martha's Vineyard. She conducted gunnery practice there from 5 to 19 September before returning to Tompkinsville from 30 September to 5 October and then moved to New York City, anchoring in the Hudson River from 5 to 20 October, while she waited for a dry dock to open up at the Norfolk Navy Yard. She then sailed south to Norfolk and arrived on 22 October, where she was docked from 24 October to 24 December for periodic maintenance; she was then moved to Newport News Shipbuilding for dry-docking from 24 to 30 December.

=== 1905–1908 ===
After emerging from dry dock, Iowa rejoined the fleet on 3 January 1905 at Hampton Roads and Captain Benjamin Franklin Tilley took command of the vessel on 14 January. The ship then took part in a series of maneuvers with the rest of the squadron off Culebra in mid January, Guantánamo Bay from 19 February to 22 March, and then Pensacola from 27 March to 3 May. She then returned to Hampton Roads on 7 May for repairs at Norfolk that lasted from 9 May to 24 June. She helped to test the new floating dry dock Dewey from 25 to 30 June, thereafter returning to Newport News for periodic maintenance from 30 June to 3 July. Iowa then sailed north to New England, visiting several ports, including Provincetown, Newport, Bar Harbor, Boston, and New York over the course of the next four months. She arrived back in Hampton Roads on 13 October, where she remained until the end of the month, when she sailed to visit Annapolis, Maryland, from 30 October to 7 November.

Iowa then steamed to North River, New York, staying there from 8 to 20 November, before returning to Hampton Roads for another refit at the Norfolk Navy Yard from 22 November to 23 December. She then returned to New York for a short dry-docking from 26 to 28 December before sailing back south to Hampton Roads on the last day of the year. She lay there through 17 January 1906 before getting underway for the Caribbean, stopping in Culebra from 22 January to 6 February, Barbados from 8 to 15 February, and then Guantánamo Bay from 19 February to 31 March. Shooting practice followed from 1 to 10 April off Cape Cruz, Cuba. Iowa then steamed north to Annapolis to participate in the ceremonial return of John Paul Jones after his remains had been exhumed from his original grave in Paris so they could be re-interred at the US Naval Academy. The battleship then operated off the East Coast, stopping in Hampton Roads, Newport News, and New York between late April and mid-May. While in New York in early May, she had two of her torpedo tubes removed. She then underwent an overhaul in Norfolk from 14 May to 30 June.

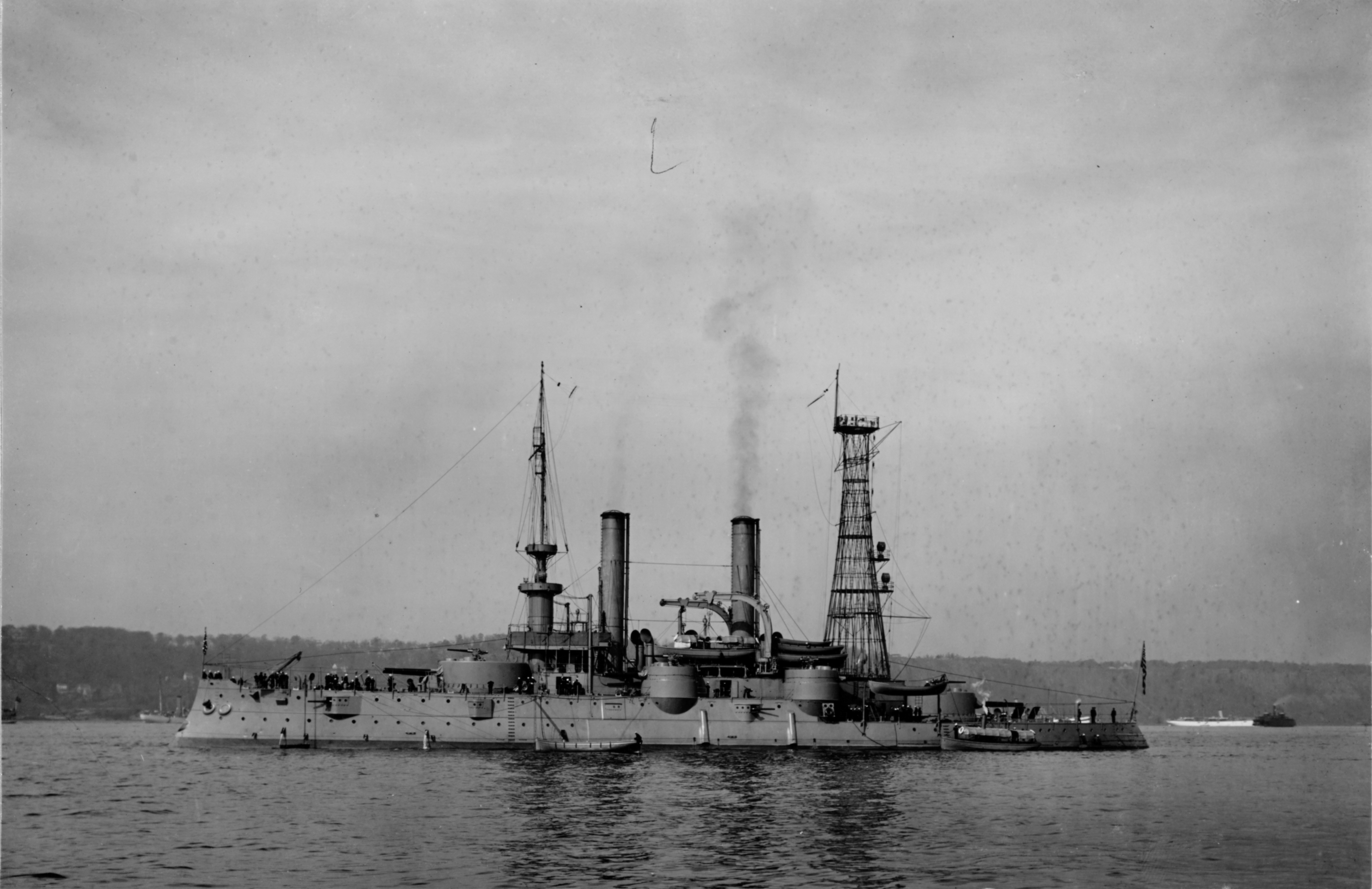
Iowa in New York, c. 1911

The ship next moved to Tompkinsville in early July, coaling there before being dry-docked at the New York Navy Yard for repairs from 6 to 15 July. She then joined the ships of the Second Division of what was now the Atlantic Fleet for a tour of New England, stopping in a series of ports in the region through the end of August. She was present for a fleet review held on 1–2 September, which was observed by President Theodore Roosevelt. She then returned to New England waters for shooting practice in late September and early October, after which she steamed south to Norfolk for repairs. She took part in tests with equipment that would allow the ship to replenish coal while underway in mid-December. The ship ended the year cruising with the rest of the fleet off the central East Coast, putting in at Hampton Roads on 31 December. The fleet steamed south to Cuba in early January 1907 for maneuvers that were held off Guantánamo Bay from 7 January to 10 February. Iowa then visited Cienfuegos in mid February and Guantánamo from mid-February to mid-March. Further gunnery practice was held from 16 March to 6 April.

Iowa was present for the Jamestown Exposition later in April, which marked the 300th anniversary of the foundation of the Jamestown Colony. The ship rejoined the fleet for a visit to North River from 16 May to 5 June, after which she operated with the Fourth Division for maneuvers off the coast of Virginia. After returning to Hampton Roads on 28 June, she was reduced to reserve on 6 July at the Norfolk Navy Yard. That day, Lieutenant Commander Clarence Stewart Williams took command of the vessel. The ship was moved to Philadelphia and was decommissioned there on 23 July 1908. While out of service, the ship had a series of improvements made, including the installation of new hydraulic equipment for her 12-inch turrets and a lattice mast aft of her funnels. The magazines and shell hoists for her 4-inch guns were modified to improve shell handling.

=== 1910–1919 ===
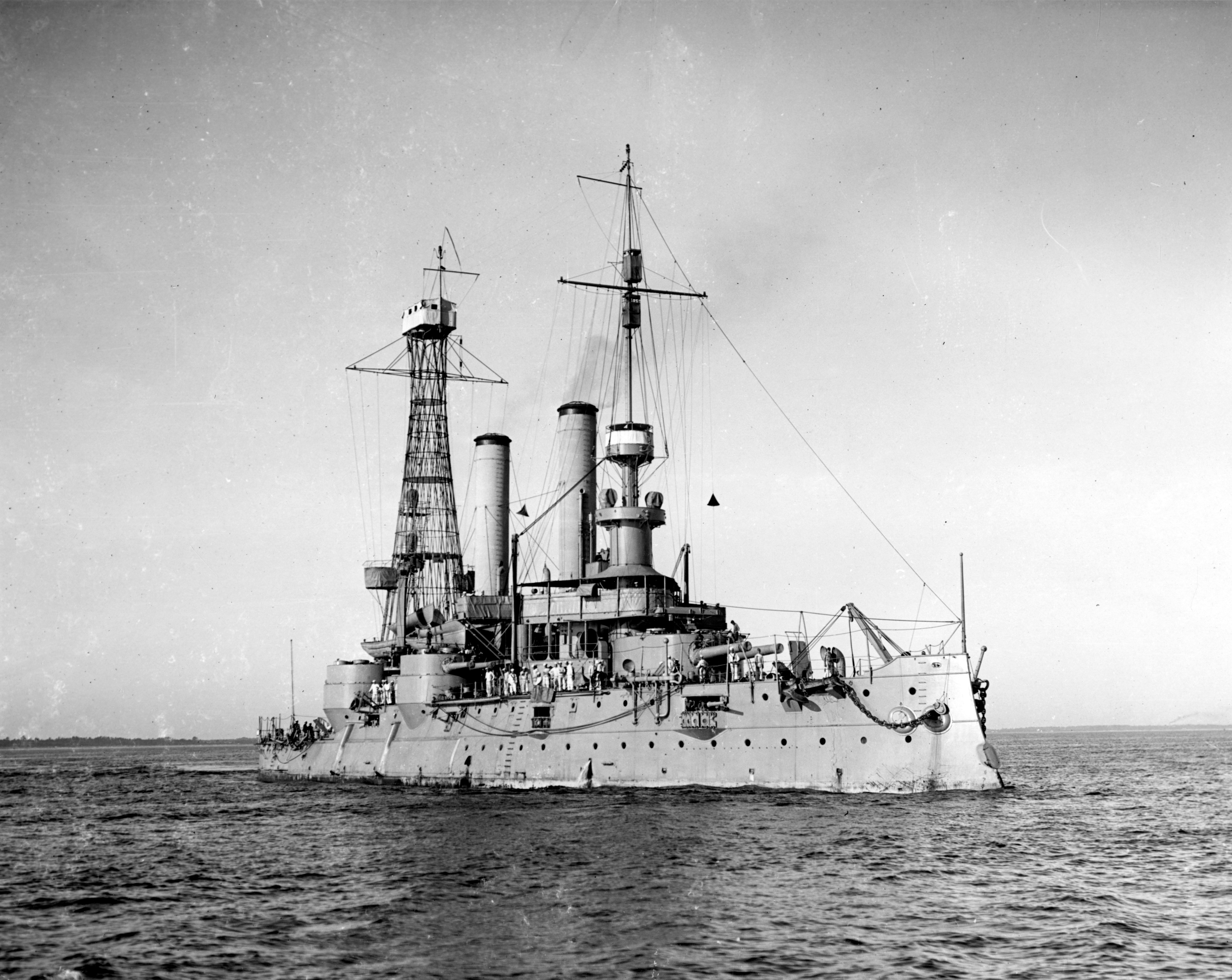
Iowa underway in 1918 during World War I

Iowa was moved to the New York Navy Yard, where she was recommissioned on 2 May 1910, with Commander William H. G. Bullard serving as her captain. She got underway on 23 May, joining the Naval Academy Practice Squadron the next day. After embarking contingents of midshipmen from the Naval Academy, the ships in the squadron began a training cruise to Europe. Stops on the tour included Plymouth, Great Britain, from 23 to 30 June; Marseille, France, from 8 to 15 July; Gibraltar from 19 to 24 July; Funchal, Madeira, from 27 July to 2 August; and Horta, Azores from 5 to 12 August. The ships then returned to the United States, disembarking the midshipmen at the end of the month. From 6 to 19 September, she was in dock at the New York Navy Yard to have another coaling-at-sea apparatus installed; she conducted tests with the collier Vestal on 22 September. Iowa then returned to the Philadelphia Navy Yard four days later, where she was again reduced to reserve.

On 3 May 1911, Iowa returned to active service for another cruise with the Naval Academy Practice Squadron from 13 May to 5 June. While en route to join the squadron on 12 May, she and SS Hamilton rescued passengers from the sinking Ward liner Merida after she collided with the United Fruit Company's steamship Admiral Farragut some 55 nautical miles (102 km; 63 mi) east of Cape Charles, Virginia in dense fog; all 319 passengers on Merida remained alive. The ships then took on midshipmen for another voyage to Europe, stopping at Queenstown, Ireland from 18 to 27 June; Kiel, Germany from 2 to 12 July; Bergen, Norway from 14 to 24 July; and Gibraltar from 2 to 8 August. After returning to the United States, the ships disembarked their cadets at Annapolis on 28–29 August. Iowa was again decommissioned in Philadelphia on 1 September. She was briefly mobilized between 28 October and 2 November as part of a mobilization exercise, during which she was moved to New York and then returned to Philadelphia.

Iowa was recommissioned in July 1912 for a training cruise for naval militia members. The cruise, conducted between 2 and 21 July, included stops in Newport, Tangier Sound, Chesapeake Bay, Baltimore, Maryland, New York, and Annapolis. The next day, she was assigned to the Atlantic Reserve Fleet, based in Philadelphia. She was detached on 8 October to take part in a fleet review held in Philadelphia from 10 to 15 October. She was placed in ordinary on 30 April 1913 in Philadelphia and was formally decommissioned on 23 May 1914.

After the United States entered World War I on 6 April 1917, Iowa was placed in limited commission on 23 April for use as a receiving ship for naval recruits. She remained in Philadelphia for six months before being moved to Hampton Roads, where she spent the rest of the conflict. While there, she was employed as a training vessel for new recruits and a guard ship defending the entrance to Chesapeake Bay through the end of the war in November 1918. On 31 March 1919, Iowa was decommissioned for the last time, and on 30 April, she was renamed Coast Battleship No. 4 so that her name could be reused for the South Dakota-class battleship Iowa. The new ship was laid down the next year, but was cancelled before completion as a result of the 1922 Washington Naval Treaty.

=== Target ship ===
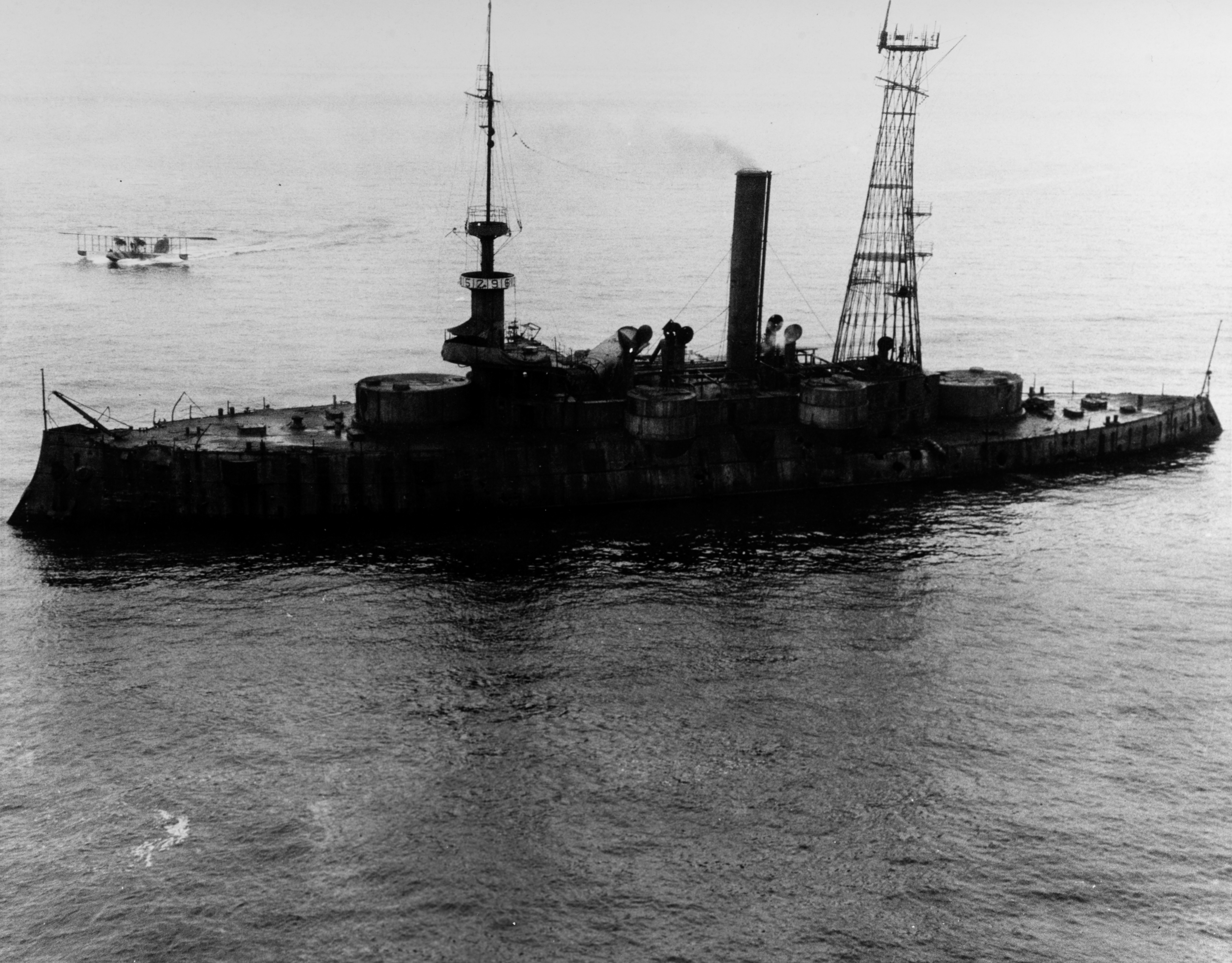
Coast Battleship No. 4 on 22 March 1923, damaged by gunfire from USS Mississippi

With no further use for the ship by 1919, the Navy decided to convert Coast Battleship No. 4 into a radio-controlled target ship. She was briefly struck from the Naval Vessel Register on 4 February 1920 before the order was reversed six days later. She was subsequently turned over to the captain of the battleship USS Ohio on 2 August. Coast Battleship No. 4 was converted for radio control in Philadelphia, with a wireless receiver that could control both the steering and speed of the ship as well as pumps to control the boilers, which were replaced with oil-fired versions. She was then moved from Philadelphia to Hampton Roads under radio control, departing on 17 August without any crew aboard, her speed and course being directed from the deck of Ohio. Tests to determine the effectiveness of control from Ohio were conducted there through 10 September, when the Navy was informed of their success.

In June 1921, the Navy and Army conducted a series of bombing tests off the Virginia Capes to evaluate the effectiveness of aircraft against warships. The Navy also sought to determine the ability of internal compartmentalization to resist flooding from bomb attacks. Coast Battleship No. 4 was used as part of these experiments on 29 June as a moving target. It took Navy aircraft nearly two hours to locate her after being informed of her presence in a 25,000-square-mile (65,000 km^{2}) area; she was then attacked with dummy bombs. The aircraft scored two hits, out of eighty bombs dropped. The Army refused to participate in the attacks on Iowa, as General Billy Mitchell complained that attacking with simulated bombs had little merit. The ability of the ship to maneuver significantly hindered the aircrews' ability to locate and attack the vessel, and the Navy called off further attempts with live munitions that the Army requested.

Coast Battleship No. 4 was then laid up in Philadelphia, where she was reclassified as an "unclassified miscellaneous auxiliary" with the hull number of IX-6 on 21 July. She next went to sea in April 1922 for shooting practice off the Virginia Capes with Shawmut now serving as her control ship, but the exercises were cancelled and she returned to port. The ship was moved to the Pacific Ocean via the Panama Canal for shooting practice with the new battleship Mississippi as part of Fleet Problem I in February 1923, which was to simulate an attack on the Canal Zone. Shawmut reprised her role as command ship. The first set of drills consisted of 5-inch fire from Mississippi's secondary battery at a range of around 8,000 yards (7,300 m). Two further sets of practice shoots involved her 14-inch main guns at longer ranges. The second of these was conducted on 23 March, and Coast Battleship No. 4 was struck by three of the projectiles, which inflicted serious damage and sank her. The battleship Maryland fired a 21-gun salute as the old battleship sank. She was formally stricken from the register on 27 March, and her wreck was sold to marine salvors on 8 November.
