= 12-inch/35-caliber gun =

12"/35 caliber Mark 1 & 2 Naval Gun
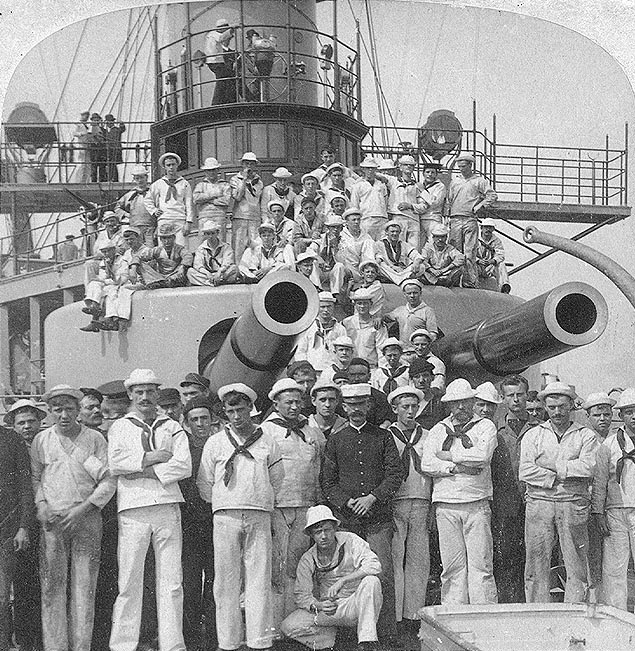
- USS Iowa – Crewmen pose by the ship's forward 12"/35 gun turret, 1898. The left-hand gun burst 9 April 1903, killing three crew men.
- Type: Naval gun
- Place of origin: United States

Service history
- In service: 1896
- Used by: United States Navy
- Wars: Spanish–American War; World War I

Production history
- Designer: Bureau of Ordnance
- Manufacturer: US Naval Gun Factory
- No. built: Mark 1: 8 (Nos. 1–8); Mark 2: 7 (Nos. 9–14, 57)
- Variants: Mark 1 and Mark 2

Specifications
- Mass: 102,550 lb (46,520 kg) (with breech); 100,800 lb (45,700 kg) (without breech)
- Length: 441 in (11,200 mm)
- Barrel length: 425 in (10,800 mm) bore (35 calibers)
- Shell: 870 lb (390 kg) armor-piercing
- Caliber: 12 in (305 mm)
- Elevation: Marks 1:-3° to +15°; Marks 2:−5° to +15°; Marks 3:−3° to +14°
- Traverse: −150° to +150°
- Rate of fire: 1 rounds per minute
- Muzzle velocity: 2,100 ft/s (640 m/s)
- Effective firing range: 12,000 yd (10,973 m) at 15° elevation (max elevation of turrets)
- Maximum firing range: 21,000 yd (19,202 m) at 30° elevation

The 12"/35 caliber gun (spoken "twelve-inch-thirty-five–caliber") were used for the primary batteries of the United States Navy's "New Navy" monitors Puritan and Monterey and the battleships Texas and Iowa.

== Mark 1 ==
The Navy's Policy Board call for a variety of large caliber weapons in 1890, with ranges all the way up to 16-inch (406 mm), led to the development of the 12-inch (305 mm)/35 caliber gun. The Mark 1, gun Nos. 1–8, was constructed of gun steel, having a tube, jacket, ten hoops and a locking ring. The Mod 0, the original design, had the inner hoop starting 6 in (150 mm) from the breech and running out to the muzzle, with the Mod 1 being hooped from breech to muzzle.

== Mark 2 ==
The Mark 2, gun Nos. 9–14 and 57, was of similar construction to the Mark 1 but with seven hoops starting from the breech and running out to the muzzle. The Mark 2 Mod 1 and Mod 2 were also given a new nickel-steel liner.

== Incident ==
Gun No. 9, mounted in Iowa's forward turret in the left-hand position, was damaged on 9 April 1903, off Pensacola, Florida, when the chase, forward of the "D" hoop, was blown off during target practice. The gun had been assembled in 1895 at the US Naval Gun Factory. The gun had fired 127 rounds with the accident happening on the 128th round. No one inside the turret were injured, but fragments of the chase were driven through the deck under the muzzle killing three men on the deck below; four others were slightly wounded. The gun was removed and sent back to the Naval Gun Factory to be examined by a special board. Their theory was that a pressure wave had built up from the burning of older smokeless powder used.

== Naval Service ==
Ship	Gun Installed	Gun Mount
USS Puritan (BM-1)	Mark 1: 12"/35 caliber (Nos. 5–8)	Mark 1: 2 × twin turrets
USS Monterey (BM-6)	Mark 1: 12"/35 caliber (Nos. 1–2)	Mark 1: 1 × twin turret
USS Texas (1892)	Mark 1: 12"/35 caliber (Nos. 3–4)	Mark 2: 2 × single turrets
USS Iowa (BB-4)	Mark 2: 12"/35 caliber (Nos. 9–14) (No. 9 replaced with No. 57)	Mark 3: 2 × twin turrets

== See also ==
=== Weapons of comparable role, performance and era ===
- 12-inch gun M1895 - contemporary US Army coast defense weapon
- BL 12-inch Mk VIII naval gun - contemporary British naval weapon
- Canon de 305 mm Modèle 1893/96 gun - contemporary French naval and railway weapon
