= 10-inch/31-caliber gun =

10"/31 caliber Mark 1 Mod 1/ 10"/35 caliber Mark 1 Mod 2/ 10"/30 caliber Mark 2 Naval Gun
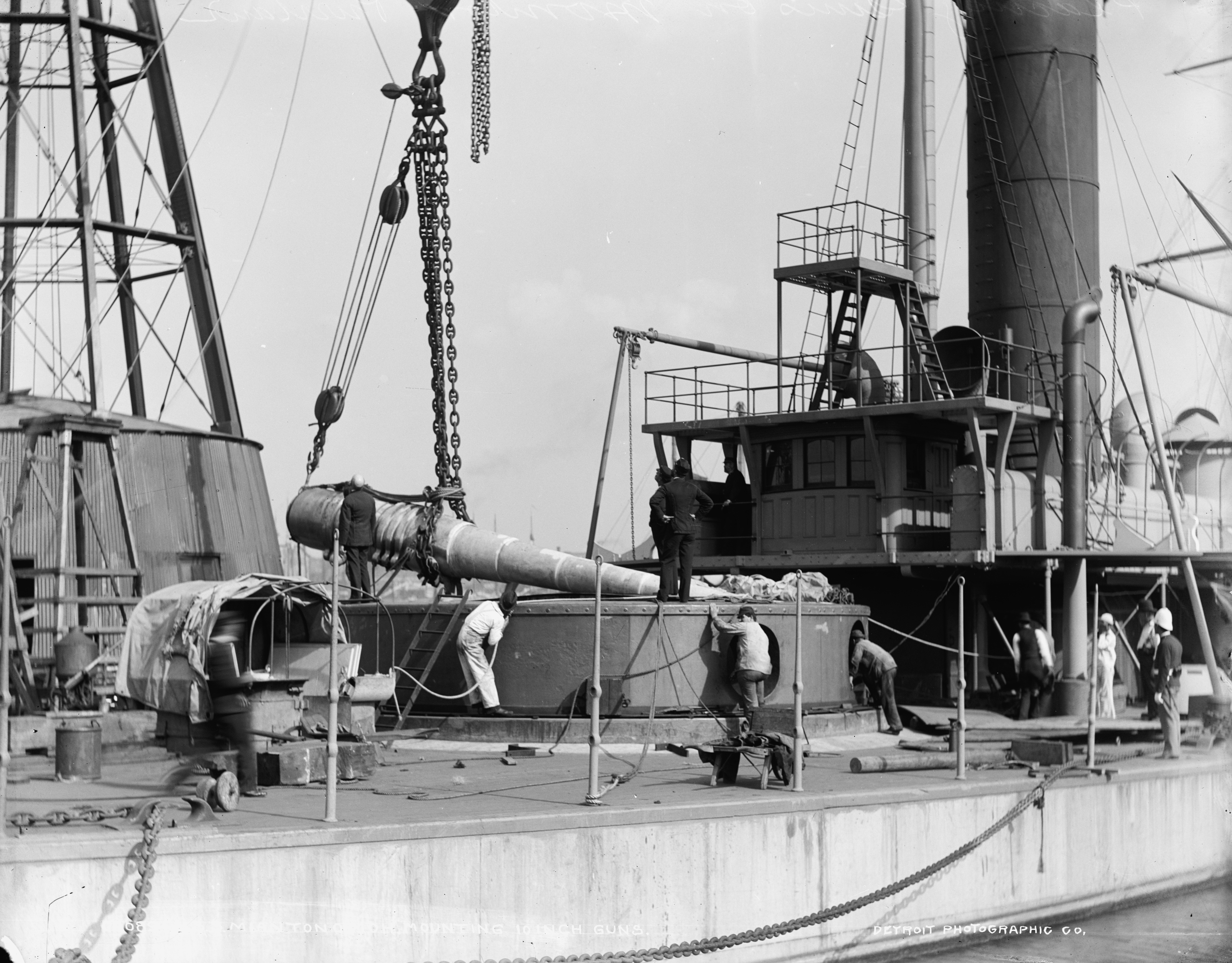
- Fitting one of the 10-inch main guns to the front turret of USS Miantonomoh (BM-5) at the New York Navy Yard, circa 1890.
- Type: Naval gun
- Place of origin: United States

Service history
- In service: 1890
- Used by: United States Navy
- Wars: Spanish–American War; World War I

Production history
- Designer: Bureau of Ordnance
- Designed: 1885
- Manufacturer: U.S. Naval Gun Factory
- Unit cost: $38,566.58
- Variants: Mark 1 Mod 1, Mark 1 Mod 2 and Mark 2

Specifications
- Mass: Mark 1 Mod 1: 57,500 lb (26,100 kg) (without breech); Mark 1 Mod 2: 61,000 lb (28,000 kg) (without breech); Mark 2: 50,200 lb (22,800 kg) (without breech)
- Length: Mark 1 Mod 1: 329.1 in (8,360 mm); Mark 1 Mod 2: 365.5 in (9,280 mm); Mark 2: 329.1 in (8,360 mm)
- Barrel length: Mark 1 Mod 1: 312.8 in (7,950 mm) bore (31 calibers); Mark 1 Mod 2: 349.54 in (8,878 mm) bore (35 calibers); Mark 2: 300 in (7,600 mm) bore (30 calibers)
- Shell: 510 lb (230 kg) armor-piercing
- Caliber: 10 in (254 mm)
- Elevation: Marks 1 and 2:-3° to +13.5°; Marks 3 and 4:−3° to +15°
- Traverse: −150° to +150°
- Rate of fire: 1890s: 0.66 rounds per minute; 1900s: 2 – 3 rounds per minute
- Muzzle velocity: 2,000 ft/s (610 m/s)
- Effective firing range: 20,000 yd (18,000 m) at 15° elevation

The 10"/31 caliber gun Mark 1 Mod 1 (spoken "ten-inch-thirty-one--caliber") and the 10"/35 caliber gun Mark 1 Mod 2 were both used for the primary batteries of the United States Navy's Amphitrite-class monitor Miantonomoh. The 10"/30 caliber gun Mark 2 was used as main armament on the remaining Amphitrite-class monitors, the monitor Monterey, and the armored cruiser Maine.

The Navy's Policy Board called for a variety of large-caliber weapons in 1890, with ranges all the way up to 16-inch (406 mm). This 10-inch (254 mm) gun had been in development since 1885. The Navy desired a lightweight heavy weapon with a 10-inch bore to arm their coastal monitors and the armored cruiser Maine, which would later be classified a "Second Class Battleship." The 10-inch/31 caliber gun would be the first heavy breech loader (BL) gun in the "New Navy" and be the ancestor to all large-caliber BL guns built in the United States.

== Mark 1 ==
The 10-inch Mark 1 was a built-up gun constructed in a length of 31 caliber, Mod 0 and Mod 1, and also 35 caliber, Mod 2. These were both mounted in pairs on Mianonomoh and numbered 1–4 by the Navy. Both of the Mod 0 and Mod 1 guns had a tube, jacket, with the Mod 1 having a thicker jacket, and 15 hoops with a locking ring. The hoops started 5.91 in (150 mm) from the breech and extended to the muzzle. The Mod 2, was a 35 caliber gun of similar constructions but had only 14 hoops with a locking ring. These were all constructed of gun steel.

== Mark 2 ==
The Mark 2 was an even simpler construction with only 11 hoops, a different breech mechanism and reverting to a shorter, 30 caliber length, barrel. Eighteen were built, Nos. 5–26. These would be the guns used on the remaining Amphitrite-class monitors, Monterey, and Maine.

== Naval service ==
Ship	Gun Installed	Gun Mount
USS Miantonomoh (BM-5)	Mark 1 Mod 1: 10"/31 caliber; Mark 1 Mod 2: 10"/35 caliber	Mark 1: 2 × Twin Turrets
USS Amphitrite (BM-2)	Mark 2: 10"/30 caliber	Mark 2: 2 × twin turrets
USS Monadnock (BM-3)	Mark 2: 10"/30 caliber	Mark 2: 2 × twin turrets
USS Terror (BM-4)	Mark 2: 10"/30 caliber	Mark 4: 2 × twin turrets
USS Monterey (BM-6)	Mark 2: 10"/30 caliber	Mark 2: 1 × twin turret
USS Maine (ACR-1)	Mark 2: 10"/30 caliber	Mark 3: 2 × twin turrets

== Surviving Guns ==
Two Mark 2 guns from USS Maine exist in Havana, Cuba, where they were incorporated into a memorial dedicated to victims of the ship's destruction.
