= USS Monterey (BM-6) =

Monitor of the United States Navy

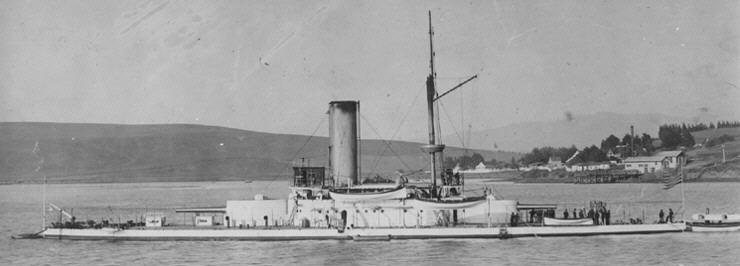
- The USS Monterey at Mare Island Navy Yard.

History

United States
- Builder: Union Iron Works, CA
- Cost: $1,871,394 (hull and machinery)
- Laid down: 20 December 1889
- Launched: 28 April 1891
- Commissioned: 13 February 1893
- Decommissioned: 27 August 1921
- Fate: Scrapped February 1922

General characteristics
- Displacement: 4,084 tons
- Length: 260 ft 11 in (79.53 m)
- Beam: 59 ft (18 m)
- Draft: 14 ft (4.3 m)
- Speed: 13.6 knots
- Complement: 210
- Armament: 2 × 12 in; 2 × 10 in; 6 × 6-pdrs

The second USS Monterey was the sole Monterey-class monitor. Laid down by Union Iron Works, San Francisco, California, 20 December 1889, she was launched 28 April 1891, sponsored by Miss Kate C. Gunn. She was commissioned 13 February 1893.

Assigned to the Pacific Squadron for harbor defense, the Monterey operated out of Mare Island Navy Yard, making numerous voyages to ports on the West Coast on maneuvers and target practice during her first 5 years of naval service. Each spring the monitor would make a voyage down the California coast or a trip to Washington for target practice. From April to August 1895, she made an extended voyage down the South American coast to Callao, Peru, via Acapulco, Mazatlán, and Panama.

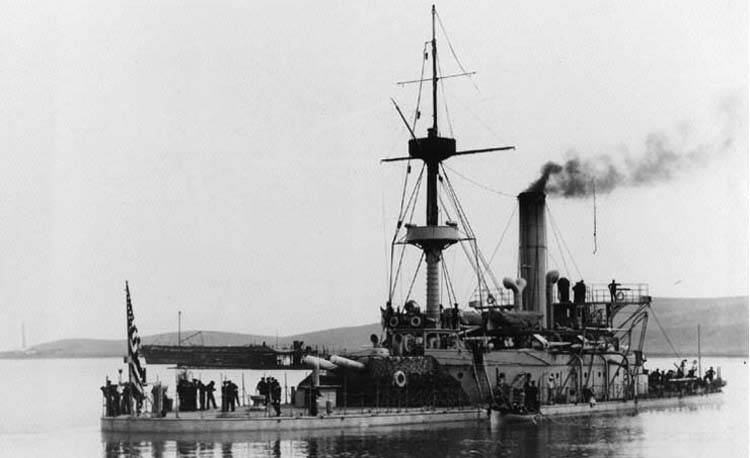
The USS Monterey at Mare Island Naval Shipyard, circa 1896. The USS Camanche is visible in the background.

With the outbreak of the Spanish–American War and Commodore George Dewey's great victory in Manila Bay 1 May 1898, the Monterey was ordered to sail for the Philippines to provide the Asiatic Squadron with big gun support against a possible attack by the Spanish 2nd Squadron, which included the battleship Pelayo and the large armored cruiser Emperador Carlos V.

Though not designed for extended ocean cruising, the big monitor departed San Diego, California, 11 June in company with the collier Brutus for Manila. Sailing via Honolulu and Apra, Guam, the ships made the 8,000‑mile voyage without mishap, arriving Cavite 13 August, and the Monterey remained in the Philippines, supporting the occupation of Luzon into 1899. On 18 September she commenced 5 days of operations in Subic Bay with the gunboats Charleston and Concord and the supply ship Zafiro, helping to destroy a large gun at the head of the bay on the 25th. She remained in the Philippines until 6 April 1900, then sailing for China, where she received new boilers at Hong Kong. The Monterey operating from July 1900 to September 1901 as station ship at Shanghai, voyaging upriver to Nanjing from 25 to 31 July 1902 with Special Commissioner T. S. Sharretts on board for a diplomatic mission. The Monterey continued her operations along the coast of China from Yantai to Hong Kong, and also served as station ship at Shanghai for short periods. She returned to Cavite in the spring of 1903 for repairs, and was decommissioned 15 December 1904.

The Monterey recommissioned in reserve at Olongapo Naval Station on 28 September 1907, but 8 1/2 months later was placed in ordinary on 7 May 1908. She remained at Olongapo, recommissioning in reserve through November 1911, and making brief voyages to Cavite, Manila, and Subic Bay for repairs and target practice. She was placed in full commission 9 November 1911 and two days later sailed for Amoy, China. The Monterey operated off the China coast to protect American interests at Fuzhou, Shantou, and Shanghai until, returning by Hong Kong to Cavite 16 November 1913. The Monterey returned to reserve at Olongapo 11 February 1913, and when World War I broke out in Europe moved to Cavite 11 August 1914. She returned to Olongapo in May 1915 and on 24 December sailed to cruise the Philippines, operating in the Manila‑Cavite area on drills, recruiting, and making an island patrol as far south as Zamboanga, Mindanao, returning to Cavite 29 June 1916.

The old monitor departed Cavite 13 November 1917, and was taken in tow by collier Ajax on the 15th. She proceeded by way of Guam to Pearl Harbor, arriving 19 December. Assigned as the station ship for Pearl Harbor Naval Station, the Monterey remained in service at the submarine base until she was decommissioned 27 August 1921. She was sold to A. Bercovich Co., Oakland, California in February, 1922, and towed across the Pacific to be scrapped.
