= USS Arkansas (BM-7) =

U.S. Navy ship built launched in 1900

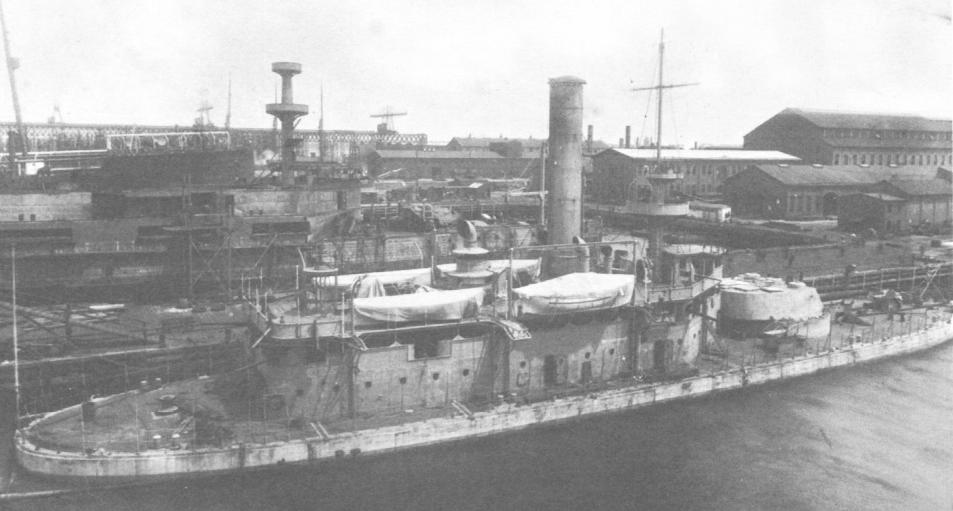
- USS Arkansas (M-7), fitting out at Newport News Shipbuilding & Drydock Co., 1 July 1902. Her armament is completely installed and the ship is only four months away from commissioning. The ship in the background is the battleship Missouri.

History

United States
- Name: Arkansas (1899–1909); Ozark (1909–1922)
- Namesake: The State of Arkansas; Ozark, Arkansas
- Ordered: 4 May 1898
- Awarded: 11 October 1899
- Builder: Newport News Shipbuilding, Newport News, Virginia
- Cost: $1,110,025 (hull and machinery)
- Laid down: 18 November 1899
- Launched: 10 November 1900
- Sponsored by: Bobbie Newton Jones
- Acquired: 8 September 1902
- Commissioned: 28 October 1902
- Decommissioned: 20 August 1919
- Renamed: Ozark, 2 March 1909
- Identification: Hull symbol: M-7; Hull Symbol: BM-7, 17 July 1920
- Honors and awards: Mexican Service Medal
- Fate: Sold, 26 January 1922

General characteristics
- Type: Arkansas-class monitor
- Displacement: 3,225 long tons (3,277 t) (standard); 3,356 long tons (3,410 t) (full load)
- Length: 255 feet 1 inch (77.75 m) (overall); 252 ft (77 m) (waterline)
- Beam: 50 ft (15 m)
- Draft: 12 ft 6 in (3.81 m) (mean)
- Installed power: 4 × Thornycroft boilers; 2,400 indicated horsepower (1,800 kW); 1,739 ihp (1,297 kW) (on trials)
- Propulsion: 2 × Vertical triple expansion engines; 2 × screw propellers
- Speed: 12.5 knots (23.2 km/h; 14.4 mph) (design); 12.03 kn (22.28 km/h; 13.84 mph) (on trial)
- Complement: 13 officers 209 men
- Armament: 2 × 12 in (305 mm)/40 caliber breech-loading rifles (1×2); 4 × 4 in (102 mm)/50 cal guns (4×1); 3 × 6-pounder (57 mm, 2.2 in) guns; 4 × 1-pounder, rapid fire guns
- Armor: Harvey armor; Side belt: 11–5 in (280–130 mm); Barbette: 11–9 in (280–230 mm); Gun turret: 10–9 in (250–230 mm); Deck: 1.5 in (38 mm); Conning tower: 8 in (200 mm)

The second USS Arkansas, was a single-turreted "New Navy" monitor and one of the last monitors built for the United States Navy. Arkansas was ordered on 4 May 1898 and awarded to Newport News Shipbuilding & Dry Dock Company on 11 October 1899. She was laid down just over a month later on 18 November 1899. Arkansas was launched almost a year later on 10 November 1900, sponsored by Bobbie N. Jones; but not commissioned for another two years, on 28 October 1902, with Commander Charles E. Vreeland in command.

This last class of monitors had been designed and built because of public demand for coastal defense before the Spanish–American War. By the time they were built and commissioned their purpose had passed. They didn't fit into the Navy's new purpose and so they bounced around from one different assignment to another. In 1909, the ship was renamed Ozark so that her name could be used for a new battleship. Ozark and her sisters were refitted as submarine tenders in 1913 because of their low freeboards.

== Design ==
The Arkansas-class monitors had been designed to combine a heavy striking power with easy concealment and negligible target area. They had a displacement of 3,225 long tons (3,277 t; 3,612 short tons), measured 255 ft 1 in (77.75 m) in overall length, with a beam of 50 ft 1 in (15.27 m) and a draft of 12 ft 6 in (3.81 m). She was manned by a total crew of 13 officers and 209 men.

Arkansas was powered by two vertical triple expansion engines driving two screw propellers with steam generated by four Thornycroft boilers. The engines in Arkansas were designed to produce 2,400 indicated horsepower (1,800 kW) with a top speed of 12.5 kn (23.2 km/h; 14.4 mph), however, on sea trials she was only able to produce 1,739 ihp (1,297 kW) with a top speed of 12.03 kn (22.28 km/h; 13.84 mph). Arkansas was designed to provide a range of 2,360 nautical miles (4,370 km; 2,720 mi) at 10 kn (19 km/h; 12 mph).

The ship was armed with a main battery of two 12-inch (305 mm)/40 caliber guns, either Mark 3 or Mark 4, in a Mark 4 turret. The secondary battery consisted of four 4-inch (102 mm)/50 caliber Mark 7 guns along with three 57 mm (2.2 in) Hotchkiss QF 6-pounder guns. The main belt armor was 11 in (280 mm) in the middle tapering to 5 in (130 mm) at the ends. The armor on the gun turrets was between 10 and 9 in (250 and 230 mm), with 11 to 9 in (280 to 230 mm) barbettes. Arkansas also had a 1.5 in (38 mm) thick deck.

== Construction ==
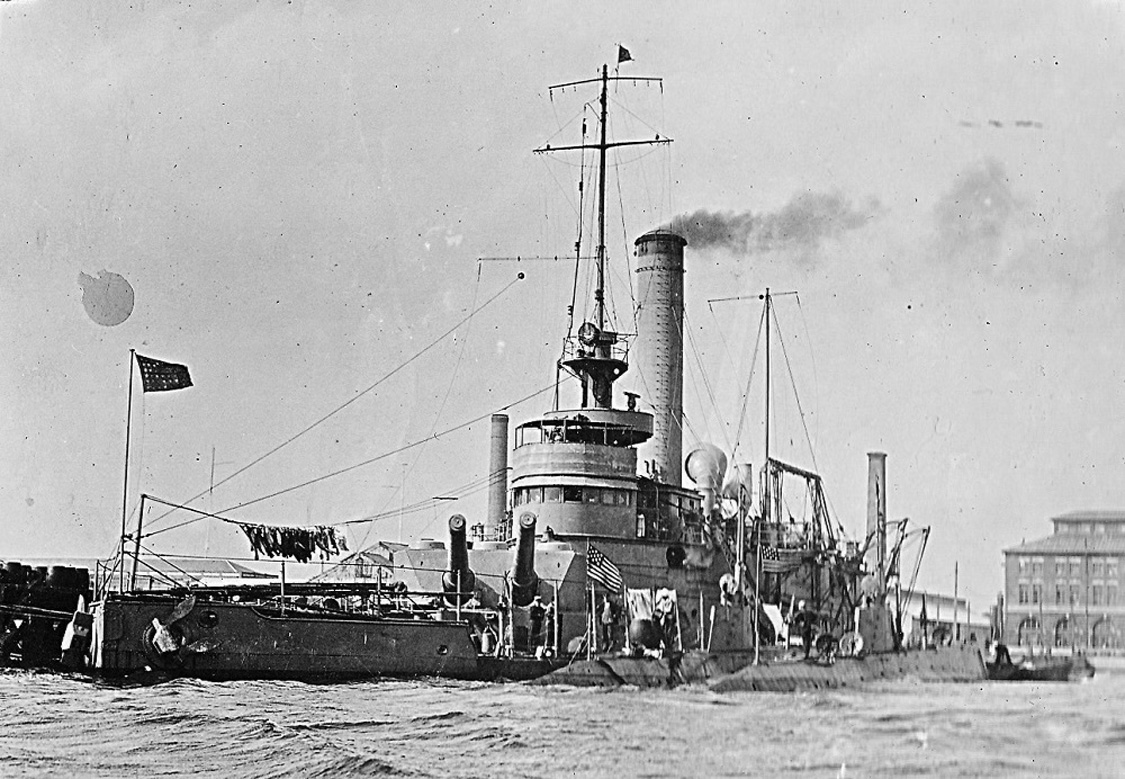
Ozark (M-7) in October 1915, Pensacola, Florida.

=== Background ===
On May 4, 1898, the U.S. Congress passed the Naval Appropriations Act of 1898. The act included the appropriation of 5 million dollars to build a new class of four new Monitors for the Navy, each to cost a maximum of $1,250,000. This came about from the call for more coastal defense vessels in the lead-up to and during the Spanish-American War. While the war with Spain almost guaranteed Congress would authorize their construction, as the act was passed less than two weeks after the war was declared, it would also be this conflict that nearly derailed the new monitors entirely. Less than a month after the ships were successfully contracted, reports were received from Rear Admiral William T. Sampson that sharply criticized the Monitors under his command in the lead-up to and during the Bombardment of San Juan. Sampson reported that the Monitors were inefficient due to their slow speed, which greatly hindered his operations, and he noted the poor accuracy of their guns, all of which convinced him operations would have gone smoother had the monitors not been sent out at all.

In November, Secretary of the Navy John D. Long responded to the criticism by ordering all construction of the monitors to be halted while new changes were to be decided upon. Fortunately, the new ships were just beginning to be built, so any modifications wouldn't be hard to implement. In the end, very few changes would actually be made to the original designs with the biggest being a relatively slight increase in displacement and coal capacity, as well as lengthening the ship by another 30 feet.

=== Construction ===
On October 1, 1898, bidding began on the construction of the new monitors, with the Newport News Shipbuilding and Dry Dock Company ultimately being contracted to build Arkansas for a price of $860,000, though this was later increased to $960,000 following the aforementioned changes to monitors design. Despite reports stating that she would be laid down in early 1899, construction wouldn’t begin on Arkansas until August of that year, with its keel being laid in November. Her sister ships, Florida, Wyoming, and Connecticut (later Nevada), had all begun being built much earlier, though the construction on these three would also be slow as all companies contracted had many other projects. Newport News Shipbuilding in particular had many ships in the process of being built, such as the pre-dreadnought battleships Kearsarge, Kentucky, Illinois, and Missouri, as well as six commercial vessels.

=== Launch ===
A year after her keel was laid, she was launched at Newport News on November 10, 1900. Reportedly 5,000 people viewed the launch, which was attended by Governors Jones and Tyler, both of Arkansas and Virginia respectively. Bobbie Newton Jones, the daughter of the Arkansas Governor, sponsored the ship. Arkansas was released from the slipways at 11:33, and, as the ship slowly slid into the James River, Ms. Jones proceeded to break the champagne bottle against the bow of the ship and stated, “I christen thee Arkansas.” Arkansas entered the water without “leaning starboard or port” according to one account, and the launch was a success.

=== Sea trials ===
Construction of Arkansas would continue steadily throughout 1901, with the ship being described as roughly halfway completed by spring. Aside from a strike at the Newport News Shipyard in the summer, which resulted in extra guards being posted around the various ships in construction, including Arkansas, work would continue unabated for another year. On April 15, 1902, Arkansas underwent her first dock trial which was a success, with her machinery operating without any major problems. Her building test took place on July 17, in which she was taken to the outskirts of the Virginia Capes for a few hours, and again all machinery was reported as working and the ship managed a speed slightly higher than the required 11 1/2 knots. On August 6, Arkansas had its official speed trial at the Barren Island course in the Chesapeake bay, averaging a speed of slightly over 12.2 knots for over an hour, surpassing the minimum speed needed for the trail by .7 knots.

=== Commissioning ===
With the completion of all of her trials, Arkansas was turned over to the Navy on September 6 and taken to the Portsmouth Naval Yard where she arrived shortly thereafter. Arkansas was placed under the command of Charles E. Vreeland, who had been assigned to the ship in August to oversee its fitting. Prior to this Vreeland had served on a number of ships and was a member of the Board of Inspection and Survey, after which he became a commander. On October 28, 1902, Arkansas was officially commissioned into the United States Navy after a small ceremony in the afternoon, which ended with the American Flag being raised over the ship. Despite having her Keel laid down months after her sister ships she would be the first of the Arkansas-Class Monitors to enter the Navy.

== Service history ==
After shakedown, Arkansas' first duty was with the US Naval Academy in 1902 as an instruction and cruise ship for midshipmen. She was then assigned to the Coast Squadron, North Atlantic Fleet, and cruised off the east coast, in the Gulf of Mexico, and in the West Indies from 1903 to 1906. In 1906 she was once again assigned to the Naval Academy for instructional purposes until 1909.

She was renamed Ozark, 2 March 1909, so her name could be used for the new battleship USS Arkansas. She was assigned to the District of Columbia Naval Militia from 26 June 1910 until 6 March 1913, when she was recalled to the Norfolk Naval Yard to begin refitting, later that month, as a submarine tender. Ozark began her new duties as a tender on 12 July. In April 1914, Ozark participated in the United States occupation of Mexico, during the "Tampico Affair", which later made her sailors eligible for the Mexican Service Medal. On 13 October 1915, she arrived in New London, Connecticut, where the Navy established its first submarine base.

Ozark was ordered to SubDiv 6, Atlantic Fleet, 6 April 1917 and soon proceeded back to Tampico, Mexico where she cruised off the coast protecting American and Allied shipping interests. She sailed for New Orleans, 18 December 1918, after which she cruised off Key West, Central America and the Panama Canal Zone.

She returned to Hampton Roads 23 June 1919 and then on to Philadelphia, on 20 August, where she was decommissioned. When the US Navy went to two letter designators in 1920 she was redesignated BM-7 on 17 July. Ozark was sold on 26 January 1922 for scrapping.

== General and cited references ==
- Ford, Jonathan (29 May 2008). "USS Arkansas (M-7)". The Encyclopedia of Arkansas History & Culture. The Central Arkansas Library System.
- Friedman, Norman (2011). Naval Weapons of World War One: Guns, Torpedoes, Mines and ASW Weapons of All Nations; An Illustrated Directory. Barnsley: Seaforth Publishing. ISBN 978-1-84832-100-7.
- Friedman, Norman (1985). U.S. Battleships: An Illustrated Design History. Annapolis, Maryland: Naval Institute Press. ISBN 978-1-59114-247-8.
- Grobmeier, Alvin H. (1990). "Question 2/89". Warship International. XXVII (2): 198–199. ISSN 0043-0374.
- Ships' Data, U. S. Naval Vessels, 1911–. US Naval Department. 1 January 1914.
- "Table 21 – Ships on Navy List June 30, 1919". Congressional Serial Set. U.S. Government Printing Office: 769. 1921.
- DiGiulian, Tony (9 May 2015). "12"/40 (30.5 cm) Mark 3 and Mark 4". Navweaps.
- DiGiulian, Tony (15 June 2015). "4"/50 (10.2 cm) Marks 7, 8, 9 and 10". Navweaps.
- Yarnall, Paul R. (24 June 2016). "M-7 USS ARKANSAS". NavSource.

Attribution
