= Arkansas-class monitor =

Last class of four naval monitors

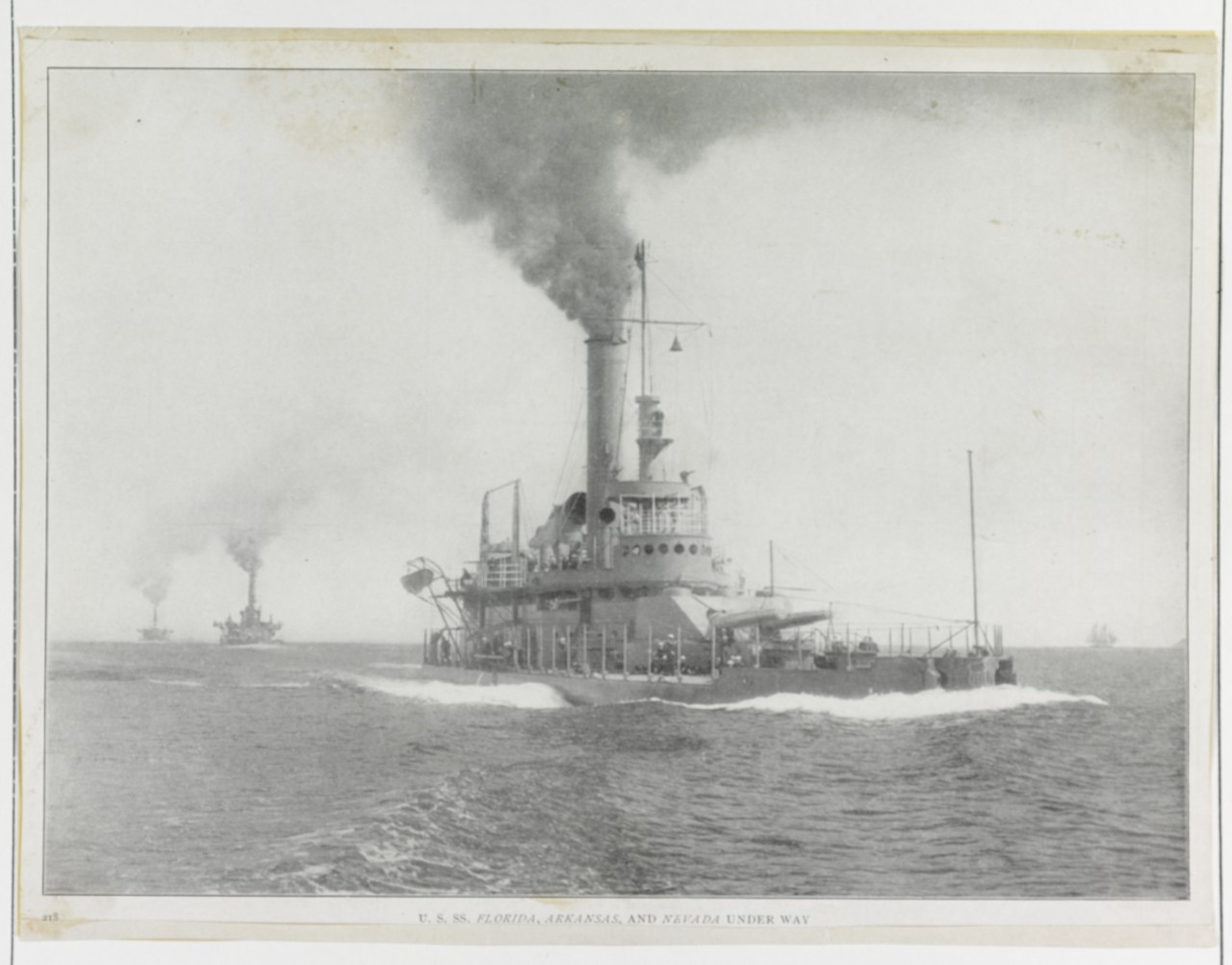
- USS Florida, Arkansas, and Nevada underway

Class overview
- Builders: Newport News SB&DD Arkansas (M-7); Bath Iron Works Nevada (M-8); Crescent Shipyard Florida (M-9); Union Iron Works Wyoming (M-10)
- Operators: United States Navy
- Preceded by: Monterey-class
- Built: 1899–1903
- In commission: 1902–1926
- Planned: 4
- Completed: 4
- Retired: 4
- Preserved: 0

General characteristics
- Type: Monitor
- Displacement: 3,225 long tons (3,277 t) (standard); 3,356 long tons (3,410 t) (full load)
- Length: 255 feet 1 inch (77.75 m) (overall); 252 ft (77 m) (waterline)
- Beam: 50 ft (15 m)
- Draft: 12 ft 6 in (3.81 m) (mean)
- Installed power: Arkansas – 4 × Thornycroft boilers; Nevada – 4 × Niclausse boilers; Florida – 4 × Mosher boilers; Wyoming – 4 × Babcock & Wilcox boilers
- Propulsion: 2 × vertical triple expansion engines; 2 × 16' screw propellers
- Speed: 12.5 knots (23.2 km/h; 14.4 mph) (design); Arkansas: 12.03 knots (22.28 km/h; 13.84 mph); Nevada: 13.04 knots (24.15 km/h; 15.01 mph); Florida: 12.4 knots (23.0 km/h; 14.3 mph); Wyoming: 11.8 knots (21.9 km/h; 13.6 mph)
- Complement: 13 officers 209 men
- Armament: 2 × 12 in (305 mm)/40 caliber breech-loading rifles (1×2); 4 × 4 in (102 mm)/40 cal guns (4×1); 3 × 6-pounder 57 mm (2.2 in) guns; 4 × 1-pounder, rapid fire guns
- Armor: Harvey armor; Side belt: 11–5 in (280–130 mm); Barbette: 11–9 in (280–230 mm); Gun turret: 10–9 in (250–230 mm); Deck: 1.5 in (38 mm); Conning tower: 8 in (200 mm)

The Arkansas-class monitors were the last class of four monitors ordered for the U.S. Navy.

== Design ==
Single-turreted monitors mounted 12-inch (305 mm)/40 caliber guns, the most modern heavy guns in the US Navy at the time they were built. The Arkansas-class monitors did not see any combat during World War I and instead served as submarine tenders. Alexander C. Brown, writing in the Society of Naval Architects and Marine Engineers Historical Transactions noted in a penetrating comment that:

Monitors found their final employment as submarine tenders in World War I for which their low freeboard hulls made them well suited. It is significant to note, however, that in this humble capacity they were ministering to the needs of that type of craft which had logically replaced them for as initially envisaged monitors were designed to combine heavy striking power with concealment and the presentation of a negligible target area

They had a displacement of 3,225 long tons (3,277 t; 3,612 short tons), measured 255 feet 1 inch (77.75 m) in overall length, with a beam of 50 feet 1 inch (15.27 m) and a draft of 12 feet 6 inches (3.81 m). They were manned by a total crew of 13 officers and 209 men.

Arkansas' were powered by two vertical triple expansion engines driving two screw propellers with steam generated by four steam boilers. The engines in the Arkansas' were designed to produce 2,400 indicated horsepower (1,800 kW) with a top speed of 12.5 knots (23.2 km/h; 14.4 mph), however, on sea trials only Nevada had top speed over 12.5 knots, 13.04 kn (24.15 km/h; 15.01 mph), the rest came in below. The Arkansas' was designed to provide a range of 2,360 nautical miles (4,370 km; 2,720 mi) at 10 kn (19 km/h; 12 mph).

The ships were armed with a main battery of two 12-inch/40 caliber guns, either Mark 3 or Mark 4, in a Mark 4 turret. The secondary battery consisted of four 4-inch (102 mm)/50 caliber Mark 7 guns along with three 6-pounder 57 mm (2.2 in) guns. The main belt armor was 11 in (280 mm) in the middle tapering to 5 in (130 mm) at the ends. The gun turrets were between 10 and 9 in (250 and 230 mm), with 11 to 9 in (280 to 230 mm) barbettes. The Arkansas' also had a 1.5 in (38 mm) deck.

== Construction ==
In response to increasing public pressure regarding the state of the nation's coastal defense forces and hastened by the outbreak of war with Spain, the U.S. Congress passed the Naval Appropriations Act of 1898 on May 4, which, among many other things, authorized the appropriation of $5 million to build four new monitors, each of which were to cost no more than $1,250,000. The new ships, created for harbor defense, were designed by chief constructor Philip Hichborn with the original plans calling for a length of 225 ft and a beam of 50 ft, with a displacement of 2700 tons, a coal capacity of 200 tons, and a side armor belt of 11-inch thickness. For armament, the ship was to be equipped with a main battery containing a single turret with two 12-inch guns (Hichborn balanced), and four rapid-fire breech-loading rifles, with a secondary battery consisting of three 6-pound and four 1-pound rifles. Powered by two vertical triple-expansion type engines and twin-screw propellers, the ship would have a maximum speed of 12 knots.

=== Contractors ===
Bidding began for the construction of the new monitors on October 1, with the following results, including price:

- USS Arkansas - Newport News Shipping & Dry Dock Company - $860,000
- USS Connecticut - Bath Iron Works - $862,000
- USS Florida - Crescent Shipyard - $825,000
- USS Wyoming - Union Iron Works - $875,000

Following the bidding, the Navy announced the names of the ships.

=== Criticism and proposed redesign ===
The new monitors were criticized by many, as their design and armament made them no greater than any of the older monitors, such as the Monterey, Monadnock, and Terror. The main complaint was the single turret, rather than a two-turret design as seen on the Terror. There were also those that argued that the construction of four ships was a waste of money, as the monitors that participated in the Spanish-American War were met with considerable criticism, most chiefly from Rear Admiral William T. Sampson who criticized the slowness of the vessels and their firing accuracy.

In response to these criticisms, Secretary of the Navy John D. Long ordered that all construction on the new vessels be halted while the Bureau of Naval Construction met to decide on changes in early November. Lewis Nixon of the Crescent Shipyard, the contractors of the USS Florida, submitted a new design for the monitors which the Navy appears to have favored. The final proposed changes included the following:

1. Replacing the single turret of two 12-inch guns with two turrets of two 10-inch guns in each
2. Increasing the maximum displacement from 2700 tons to 4000 tons
3. Increase the coal capacity from 200 tons to 400 tons
4. Lengthening the vessels by 30 ft

The Navy was confident that changes could be made within the $1.25 million budget set by Congress as they were surprised at how low the bids were for the four ships, with the highest contract, costing $875,000, leaving a minimum of $350,000 left over for each ship. The four ships were originally contracted at a price of $3,422,000 altogether. Throughout November the Bureau and shipbuilders discussed possible design changes, with the shipbuilders stating that their proposed changes would still go over the budget set by the Naval Apportions Act. Eventually, the two sides came to an agreement, which included the following:

1. Retention of the single turret with two 12-inch guns
2. Increased displacement by over 500 tons
3. Increased coal capacity
4. Lengthening the vessels from 225 ft to 255 ft

In the end, the most prominent point of contention, the main armament, was kept the same, with the Navy receiving, on paper, most of what they wanted asides from that. Due to the new changes, the contract price of all monitors was increased by $100,000.

=== Armor ===
As November drew to a close, it was reported that the new monitors would be armored with Krupp Steel, which would be a first for a vessel in the U.S. Navy. However, Congress only authorized a maximum payment of $400 a ton for armor, a price that was too low to purchase Krupp Steel. In June the Navy would instead outfit the ships with Harvey armor, which they purchased from both Carnegie Steel and Bethlehem Ironworks. Contracts for this armor were made in August and September 1899, totaling 2,152 tons. The armor was of great want to the Navy in a timely manner and did not wish to have any delays.

=== Connecticut renaming ===
The same year it was launched, Connecticut would undergo a change that had been lobbied for since 1898, though not in its design but rather its name. The state of Connecticut protested that a small monitor was named after the state rather than a battleship, as had been the case with Rhode Island. The Navy eventually relented, and the name was removed, with the former Connecticut being referred to as "Monitor No. 8" until another candidate was chosen. Oklahoma and Arizona both offered up their names before it eventually went to Nevada.

=== Launch and commissioning ===
Construction progressed throughout the remainder of the 19th century and in the fall of 1900, Wyoming, Arkansas, and Nevada were launched, with Florida following a year later. All Arkansas-class monitors were commissioned by the summer of 1903.

== Ships of the class ==
| Ship Names | Launched | First Commission | Last Decommission | Fate | Notes |
|---|---|---|---|---|---|
| Wyoming (later Cheyenne) | September 8, 1900 | December 8, 1902 | June 1, 1926 | Sold for scrap, April 30, 1939 | Underwent several recommissionings and decommissionings. Last monitor of the U.S. Navy. |
| Arkansas (later Ozark) | November 10, 1900 | October 28, 1902 | August 20, 1919 | Sold for scrap, January 26, 1922 | |
| Nevada (later Tonopah) | November 24, 1900 | March 5, 1903 | July 1, 1920 | Sold for scrap, January 26, 1922 | |
| Florida (later Tallahassee) | November 30, 1901 | June 18, 1903 | March 24, 1922 | Sold for scrap, July 25, 1922 | |

== Bibliography ==
- DiGiulian, Tony (May 9, 2015). "United States of America 12"/40 (30.5 cm) Mark 3 and Mark 4". Navweaps.
- DiGiulian, Tony (June 15, 2015). "United States of America 4"/50 (10.2 cm) Marks 7, 8, 9 and 10". Navweaps.
- Friedman, Norman (1985). U.S. Battleships: An Illustrated Design History. Annapolis, Maryland: Naval Institute Press. ISBN 978-1-59114-247-8.
- Yarnall, Paul R. (June 24, 2016). "M-7 USS ARKANSAS". NavSource.
