= USS Nevada (BM-8) =

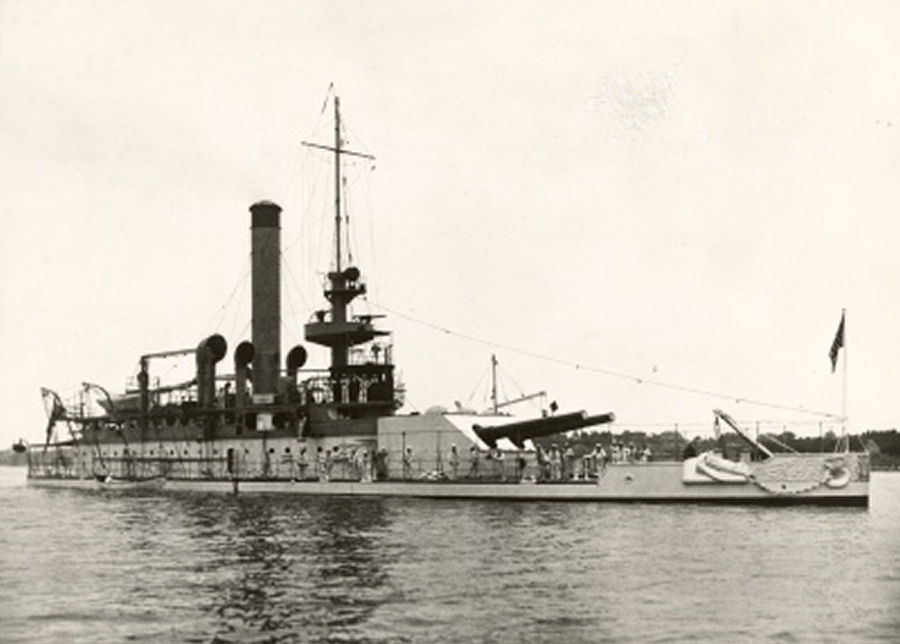
- The crew is out on a Sunday in 1909 in dress whites.

History

United States
- Name: Connecticut (1899-1901); Nevada (1901-1909); Tonopah (1909-1922)
- Namesake: The State of Connecticut; The State of Nevada; Tonopah, Nevada
- Ordered: 4 May 1898
- Awarded: 19 October 1898
- Builder: Bath Iron Works, Bath, Maine
- Cost: $1,851,313.22
- Laid down: 17 April 1899
- Launched: 24 November 1900
- Commissioned: 5 March 1903
- Decommissioned: 1 July 1920
- Renamed: Nevada, January 1901; Tonopah, 2 March 1909
- Identification: Hull symbol:M-8; Hull Symbol:BM-8, 17 July 1920
- Fate: Sold, 26 January 1922

General characteristics
- Type: Arkansas-class monitor
- Displacement: 3,225 long tons (3,277 t) (standard); 3,356 long tons (3,410 t) (full load)
- Length: 255 feet 1 inch (77.75 m) (overall); 252 ft (77 m) (waterline)
- Beam: 50 ft (15 m)
- Draft: 12 ft 6 in (3.81 m) (mean)
- Installed power: 4 × Niclausse boilers; 2,400 indicated horsepower (1,800 kW)
- Propulsion: 2 × Vertical triple expansion engines; 2 × screw propellers
- Speed: 12.5 knots (23.2 km/h; 14.4 mph) (design); 13.04 kn (24.15 km/h; 15.01 mph) (on trial)
- Complement: 13 officers 209 men
- Armament: 2 × 12 in (305 mm)/40 caliber breech-loading rifles (1×2); 4 × 4 in (102 mm)/40 cal guns (4×1); 3 × 6-pounder 57 mm (2.2 in) guns
- Armor: Harvey armor; Side belt: 11–5 in (280–130 mm); Barbette: 11–9 in (280–230 mm); Gun turret: 10–9 in (250–230 mm); Deck: 1.5 in (38 mm); Conning tower: 8 in (200 mm)

The first USS Nevada, a monitor, was ordered on 4 May 1898. She was awarded to the Bath Iron Works, Bath, Maine on 19 October 1898 and laid down as Connecticut, 17 April 1899. Connecticut was launched 24 November 1900; sponsored by Miss Grace Boutelle; renamed Nevada, January 1901; and commissioned on 5 March 1903, Commander Thomas B. Howard in command. The total cost for the hull, machinery, armor and armament was $1,851,313.22.

Nevada was renamed Tonopah in 1909 to free up the name for a new battleship.

== Design ==
The Arkansas-class monitors had been designed to combine a heavy striking power with easy concealment and negligible target area. They had a displacement of 3,225 long tons (3,277 t; 3,612 short tons), measured 255 feet 1 inch (77.75 m) in overall length, with a beam of 50 feet 1 inch (15.27 m) and a draft of 12 feet 6 inches (3.81 m). She was manned by a total crew of 13 officers and 209 men.

Nevada was powered by two vertical triple expansion engines driving two screw propellers with steam generated by four Niclausse boilers. The engines in Nevada were designed to produce 2,400 indicated horsepower (1,800 kW) with a top speed of 12.5 knots (23.2 km/h; 14.4 mph), however, on sea trials she was only able to produce 1,970 ihp (1,470 kW) but with a top speed of 13.04 kn (24.15 km/h; 15.01 mph). Nevada was designed to provide a range of 2,360 nautical miles (4,370 km; 2,720 mi) at 10 kn (19 km/h; 12 mph).

The ship was armed with a main battery of two 12-inch (305 mm)/40 caliber guns, either Mark 3 or Mark 4, in a Mark 4 turret. The secondary battery consisted of four 4-inch (102 mm)/50 caliber Mark 7 guns along with three 6-pounder 57 mm (2.2 in) guns. The main belt armor was 11 in (280 mm) in the middle tapering to 5 in (130 mm) at the ends. The gun turrets were between 10 and 9 in (250 and 230 mm), with 11 to 9 in (280 to 230 mm) barbettes. Nevada also had a 1.5 in (38 mm) deck.

== Service history ==
On 2 March 1909, the monitor was renamed Tonopah to allow Battleship Number 36 to be named Nevada. Assigned to the Atlantic Fleet's submarine force as a tender, Tonopah operated along the east coast from Massachusetts to Key West until January 1918. Then briefly assigned to Bermuda, she was ordered to Ponta Delgada, São Miguel Island, Azores in February. Between then and December she tended the submarines K-1, K-2, K-3, K-5, and E-1 and submarine chasers operating in the strategic area of the Azores.

In December, she was towed to Lisbon, and, upon her return to the United States, decommissioned at Philadelphia, Pennsylvania, on 1 July 1920. She was one of several vessels sold on 26 January 1922, to Henry A. Hitner's Sons Company of Philadelphia.

== Bibliography ==
=== Books ===
- Friedman, Norman (1985). U.S. Battleships: An Illustrated Design History. Annapolis, Maryland: Naval Institute Press. ISBN 978-1-59114-247-8.
- Ships' Data, U. S. Naval Vessels, 1911-. US Naval Department. 1 January 1914.
- Schmidt, Carl H. (1921). "Navy Yearbook". Senate Documents No. 302. 11. Washington, D.C.: U.S. Government Printing Office: 744.
- Friedman, Norman (2011). Naval Weapons of World War One. Seaforth Publishing. ISBN 978-1-84832-100-7. OCLC 751804655.

=== Online resources ===
- DiGiulian, Tony (9 May 2015). "United States of America 12"/40 (30.5 cm) Mark 3 and Mark 4". Navweaps.
- DiGiulian, Tony (15 June 2015). "United States of America 4"/50 (10.2 cm) Marks 7, 8, 9 and 10". Navweaps.
- Yarnall, Paul R. (23 March 2016). "M-8 USS Nevada". NavSource.
- DANFS (12 August 2015). "Nevada I (Monitor)". Naval History and Heritage Command.
