= Charles E. Vreeland =

American United States Navy officer

Charles Edward Vreeland
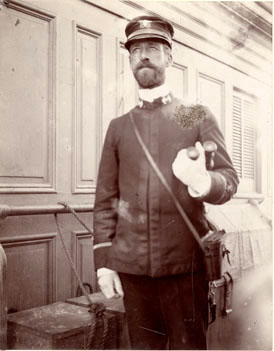
- Vreeland in June 1898.
- Born: March 10, 1852; Newark, New Jersey, US
- Died: September 27, 1916 (aged 64); Atlantic City, New Jersey, US
- Military career
- Branch: United States Navy
- Service years: 1870–1914
- Rank: Rear admiral
- Commands: Head of the Office of Naval Intelligence; USS Kansas; USS Arkansas
- Conflicts: Spanish–American War

Charles Edward Vreeland (March 10, 1852 – September 27, 1916) was an officer of the United States Navy who reached the rank of rear admiral.

== Early life ==
Born in Newark, New Jersey, Vreeland enlisted in the Navy as a naval apprentice early in 1866. After a brief service in the Sabine he was given a presidential appointment soon afterwards to enter the United States Naval Academy on July 27, 1866, graduating from that institution on June 7, 1870, as a passed midshipman. He received his commission as an ensign in November 1873 after a series of cruises aboard screw sloops.

== Naval career ==
Vreeland was further promoted to master and then lieutenant after successive tours of duty on board the screw steamer USS Alert, the gunboat USS Ashuelot and the sloop-of-war USS Ticonderoga. He then was assigned to the Nautical Almanac Office of the United States Naval Observatory in November 1881 after a brief period ashore awaiting orders. In March 1884, hebegan a three-year tour at sea aboard the sloop-of-war USS Hartford, after which he was assigned for two years at the U.S. Navy Bureau of Navigation. He then was assigned briefly (from July to September 1889) to the Office of Naval Intelligence and reported to the United States Coast and Geodetic Survey late in October 1889, a posting he took until the spring of 1893. He then was assigned a series of tours as naval attaché, first to the Kingdom of Italy in Rome, then to Austria-Hungary in Vienna, and finally to the German Empire in Berlin.

After returning to the United States late in 1896, Vreeland was posted to the battleship USS Massachusetts in mid-January 1897, and served aboard her until he was transferred to the gunboat USS Helena at the end of June 1897. He was named executive officer of the dispatch vessel USS Dolphin in April 1898, but the Spanish-American War broke out that month, and he remained aboard Helena. Aboard Helena, he served on wartime blockade duty off the port of Manzanillo, Cuba, remaining on that duty until the end of July 1898. He finally assumed duty as Dolphin′s executive officer on August 24, 1898.

Vreeland was detached from Dolphin to serve aboard the protected cruiser USS Olympia on November 6, 1898, but was ordered to the gunboat USS Concord instead on December 30, 1898, due to a change in orders. Vreeland was promoted to lieutenant commander, and served aboard various vessels in the Asiatic Squadron. He returned to the United States aboard the hospital ship USS Solace in March 1900. From April 1900 to sometime before August 1902 he was a member of the Board of Inspection and Survey, during which time he was promoted to full commander in mid-August 1901. After his duty on the Board, he supervised the fitting-out of the new monitor USS Arkansas and assumed command upon her commissioning on October 28, 1902.

Two years later, Vreeland relinquished command of the monitor (by then renamed USS Ozark)> He served ashore in a series of special assignments for the United States Department of the Navy for the next few years, during which he received a promotion to captain on April 13, 1906. After finishing his assignments ashore on April 17, 1907, with the end of a tour in Washington, D.C., he went to the New York Shipbuilding Corporation in Camden, New Jersey, the next day to commission the new Connecticut-class battleship Kansas. He commanded the battleship for the next two years, which was an auspicious time, for Kansas was picked to be part of the "Great White Fleet" that sailed around the world between December 1907 and February 1909. Soon after the fleet returned to Hampton Roads on February 22, 1909, he gave up his command of Kansas and returned home to await orders. On May 10, 1909, he succeeded Captain Raymond P. Rodgers as Chief Intelligence Officer, the head of the Office of Naval Intelligence, until December 8, 1909, when he in turn was succeeded by Captain Templin M. Potts.

As his promotion to rear admiral was imminent, Vreeland broke his flag aboard the battleship Virginia as Commander, 4th Division, United States Atlantic Fleet. On December 27, 1909, he was promoted to rear admiral.

On April 19, 1911, Vreeland reported ashore for further duty in Washington, D.C. In the newly devised aide system for managing the U.S. Navy, he became one of the four principal advisors of the United States Secretary of the Navy, George von Lengerke Meyer. As Aide for Inspections, he reached the pinnacle of naval command. During his tenure, he represented the Navy at the coronation of King George V of the United Kingdom, as well as heading the so-called "Vreeland Board" which reinvestigated the sinking of the armored cruiser (often called "battleship") Maine in an explosion in the harbor at Havana, Cuba, in February 1898, the controversial report of which—now widely regarded as erroneous—concluded that an external explosion sank Maine.

On December 12, 1911, Vreeland tour of duty as Aide for Inspections ended and he succeeded Rear Admiral Richard Wainwright as the second Aide for Operations. While in that position, Vreeland struggled to improve the defenses in the Philippine Islands, agitated for increased naval construction, particularly of battlecruisers, and supported the development of U.S. naval aviation. It was also during his tenure that naval aviation found a permanent home in Pensacola, Florida. On February 11, 1913, he was succeeded by Bradley A. Fiske as Aide for Operations, and Vreeland finished his naval career as a member of both the General Board of the United States Navy and the Joint Army and Navy Board. He retired on March 10, 1914.

Vreeland died in Atlantic City, New Jersey, after a brief retirement marked by illness.

== Namesake ==
The Knox-class frigate USS Vreeland (FF-1068) was named after Vreeland.

Military offices
Preceded by Raymond P. Rodgers	Head of the Office of Naval Intelligence (Chief Intelligence Officer); May –December 1909	Succeeded by Templin M. Potts
Preceded by none	US Naval Aide for Inspections; April–December 1911	Succeeded by Bradley A. Fiske
Preceded by Richard Wainwright	US Naval Aide for Operations; December 1911-February 1913	Succeeded by Bradley A. Fiske
