= USS Florida (BM-9) =

U.S. Navy monitor

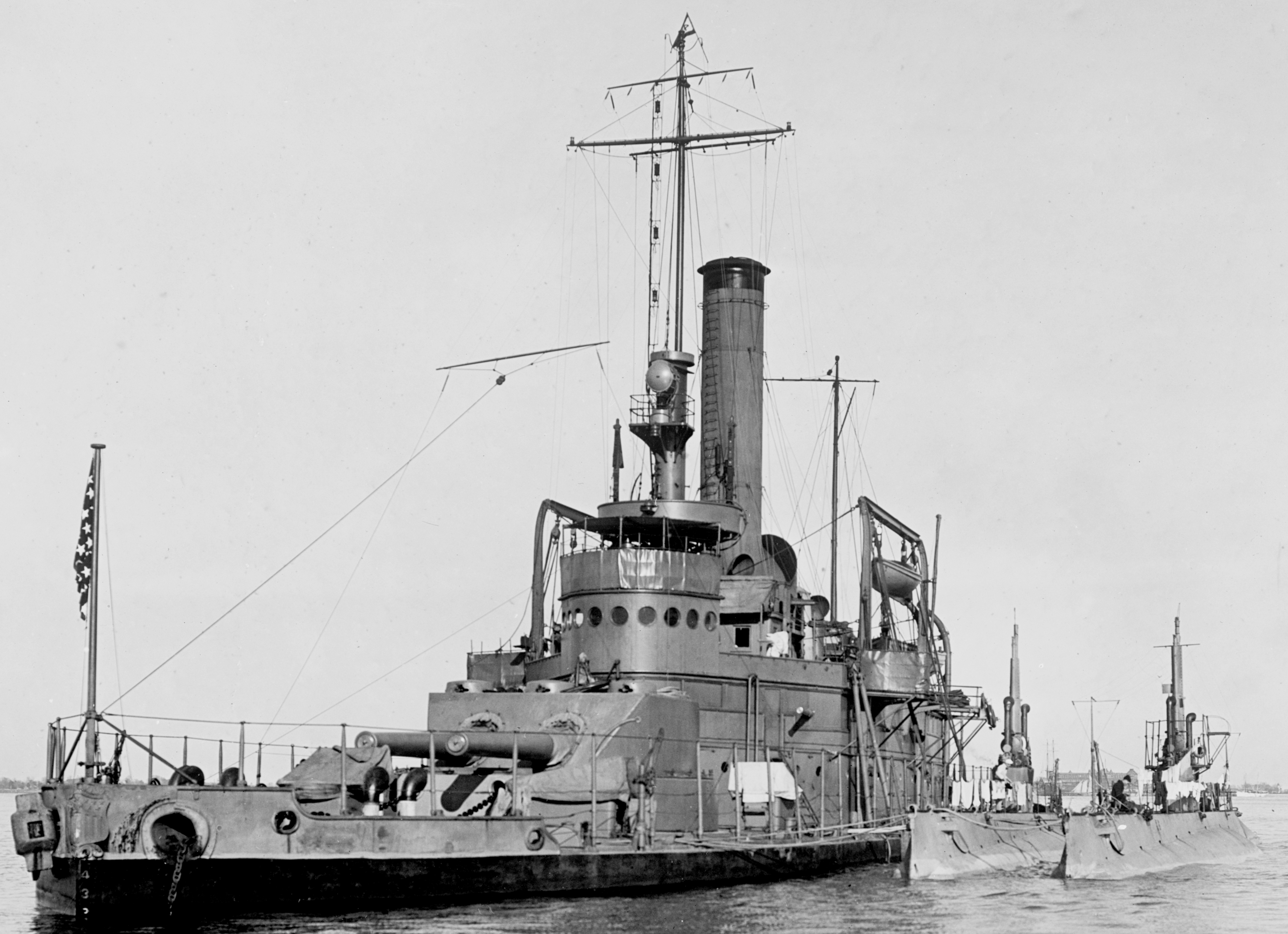
- USS Tallahassee (formerly USS Florida) tending to submarines K-5 and K-6 in Hampton Roads, 1916

History

United States
- Name: Florida (1899–1908); Tallahassee (1908–1922)
- Namesake: The State of Florida; Tallahassee, Florida
- Ordered: 4 May 1898
- Awarded: 11 Oct 1898
- Builder: Crescent Shipyard, Elizabeth, New Jersey
- Cost: $1,508,881.84
- Laid down: 23 January 1899
- Launched: 30 November 1901
- Commissioned: 18 June 1903
- Decommissioned: 24 March 1922
- Renamed: Tallahassee, 1 July 1908
- Identification: Hull symbol:M-9; Hull Symbol:BM-9, 17 July 1920; Hull symbol:IX-16, 20 July 1921
- Fate: Sold for scrapping, 25 July 1922

General characteristics
- Type: Arkansas-class monitor
- Displacement: 3,225 long tons (3,277 t) (standard); 3,356 long tons (3,410 t) (full load)
- Length: 255 feet 1 inch (77.75 m) (overall); 252 ft (77 m) (waterline)
- Beam: 50 ft (15 m)
- Draft: 12 ft 6 in (3.81 m) (mean)
- Installed power: 4 × Mosher boilers; 2,400 indicated horsepower (1,800 kW); 2,336 ihp (1,742 kW) (on trials)
- Propulsion: 2 × Vertical triple expansion engines; 2 × screw propellers
- Speed: 12.5 knots (23.2 km/h; 14.4 mph) (design); 12.4 kn (23.0 km/h; 14.3 mph) (on trial)
- Complement: 13 officers 209 men
- Armament: 2 × 12 in (305 mm)/40 caliber breech-loading rifles (1×2); 4 × 4 in (102 mm)/40 cal guns (4×1); 3 × 6-pounder 57 mm (2.2 in) guns
- Armor: Harvey armor; Side belt: 11–5 in (280–130 mm); Barbette: 11–9 in (280–230 mm); Gun turret: 10–9 in (250–230 mm); Deck: 1.5 in (38 mm); Conning tower: 8 in (200 mm)

USS Florida was an Arkansas-class monitor in the United States Navy.

Florida was ordered on 4 May 1898, and awarded to the Crescent Shipyard, Elizabethport, New Jersey, on 11 October 1898. She was laid down 23 January 1899 and launched 30 November 1901 by Lewis Nixon and Arthur Leopold Busch, a marine engineer who worked at the Crescent Shipyard; sponsored by Miss S. Wood; and commissioned 18 June 1903, with Commander John Charles Frémont Jr., in command. The total cost for the hull, machinery, armor and armament was $1,508,881.84.

So that her name could be used for a new battleship, Florida was renamed Tallahassee in 1908 and was later assigned the hull number BM-9 in 1920. She was reclassified as IX-16 in 1921 and sold for scrap the following year.

== Design ==
The Arkansas-class monitors had been designed to combine a heavy striking power with easy concealment and negligible target area. They had a displacement of 3,225 long tons (3,277 t; 3,612 short tons), measured 255 feet 1 inch (77.75 m) in overall length, with a beam of 50 feet 1 inch (15.27 m) and a draft of 12 feet 6 inches (3.81 m). She was manned by a total crew of 13 officers and 209 men.

Florida was powered by two vertical triple expansion engines driving two screw propellers with steam generated by four Mosher fire-tube boilers. The engines in Florida were designed to produce 2,400 indicated horsepower (1,800 kW) with a top speed of 12.5 knots (23.2 km/h; 14.4 mph), however, on sea trials she was only able to produce 2,336 ihp (1,742 kW) with a top speed of 12.4 kn (23.0 km/h; 14.3 mph). Florida was designed to provide a range of 2,360 nautical miles (4,370 km; 2,720 mi) at 10 kn (19 km/h; 12 mph).

The ship was armed with a main battery of two 12-inch (305 mm)/40 caliber guns, either Mark 3 or Mark 4, in a Mark 4 turret. The secondary battery consisted of four 4-inch (102 mm)/50 caliber Mark 7 guns along with three 6-pounder 57 mm (2.2 in) guns. The main belt armor was 11 in (280 mm) in the middle tapering to 5 in (130 mm) at the ends. The gun turrets were between 10 and 9 in (250 and 230 mm), with 11 to 9 in (280 to 230 mm) barbettes. Florida also had a 1.5 in (38 mm) deck.

== Service history ==
Serving with the Coast Squadron, Florida trained midshipmen on summer cruises, and operated along the east coast and in the Caribbean waters. She participated in the Presidential Naval Review in Oyster Bay, Long Island, held by Theodore Roosevelt on 3 September 1906, and four days later reported to the Naval Academy for regular service as a practice ship. She was placed in reserve 11 September 1906, but returned to full commission between 7 June and 30 August 1907, for a midshipman cruise, and between 21 May and 19 June 1908 for participation in ordnance experiments. These included testing the then-new superfire concept where turrets were mounted in line with one turret elevated to fire over the other.

On 1 July 1908, Florida was renamed USS Tallahassee to free the state name for assignment to a battleship. On 1 August 1910, she was placed in commission in reserve and began a regular schedule of ordnance experimentation and occasional duty in the Panama Canal Zone and Norfolk area as a submarine tender. During World War I she served as submarine tender in the Canal Zone and the Virgin Islands areas, and at the British Imperial fortress colony of Bermuda, 640 miles off North Carolina, the home base of the Royal Navy's America and West Indies Station, where the British Government had permitted the United States Navy to establish a base, under the command of Captain Richard H. Jackson, to support submarines, submarine chasers, and other smaller vessels crossing the Atlantic. On 30 September 1919, Tallahassee entered Charleston Navy Yard where she was decommissioned on 3 December 1919. Tallahassee was assigned to the 6th Naval District as a reserve training ship from 19 February 1920, serving in commissioned status from 3 September 1920 to 24 March 1922.

Tallahassee was redesignated as IX-16 on 20 July 1921, and decommissioned for the final time on 24 March 1922. She was sold on 25 July 1922, to Ammunition Products Corporation, of Washington, D.C.

Her bell and plaque are in the namesake city hall

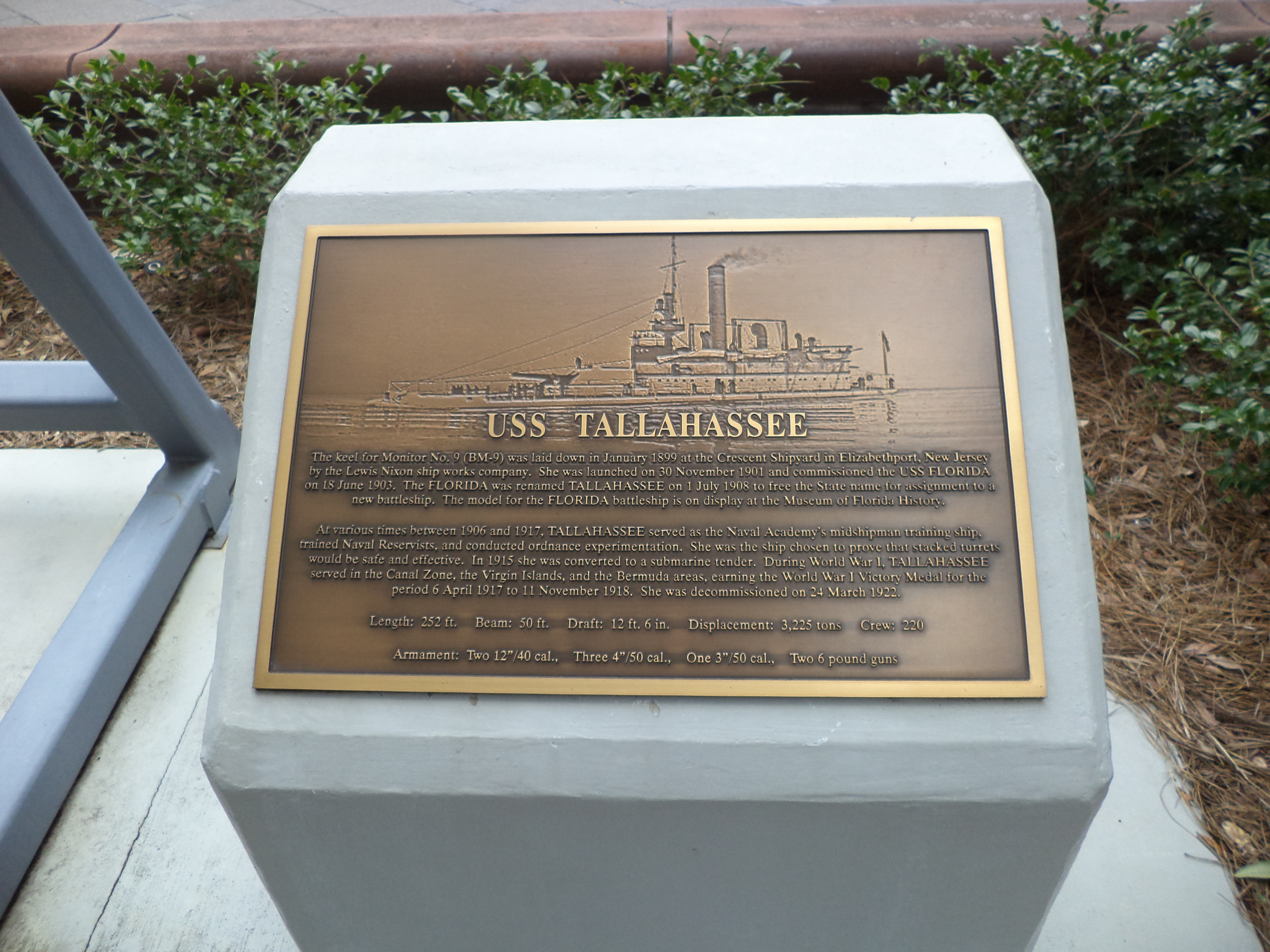
USS Tallahassee marker near bell at Tallahassee City Hall

== Bibliography ==
- Friedman, Norman (1985). U.S. Battleships: An Illustrated Design History. Annapolis, Maryland: Naval Institute Press. ISBN 978-1-59114-247-8.
- Ships' Data, U. S. Naval Vessels, 1911-. US Naval Department. 1 January 1914.
- Schmidt, Carl H. (1921). "Navy Yearbook". Senate Documents No. 302. 11. Washington, D.C.: U.S. Government Printing Office: 744.
- Friedman, Norman (2011). Naval Weapons of World War One. Seaforth Publishing. ISBN 978-1-84832-100-7. OCLC 751804655.
- DiGiulian, Tony (9 May 2015). "United States of America 12"/40 (30.5 cm) Mark 3 and Mark 4". Navweaps.
- DiGiulian, Tony (15 June 2015). "United States of America 4"/50 (10.2 cm) Marks 7, 8, 9 and 10". Navweaps.
- Wright, Christopher (2020). "Question 14/56". Warship International. LVII (3). International Naval Research Organization: 226–250. ISSN 0043-0374.
- Yarnall, Paul R. (23 March 2016). "M-8 USS Nevada". NavSource.
- DANFS (8 July 2015). "Florida IV (Monitor No. 9)". Naval History and Heritage Command. Archived from the original on 20 September 2015.
