= USS Wyoming (BM-10) =

US Navy monitor

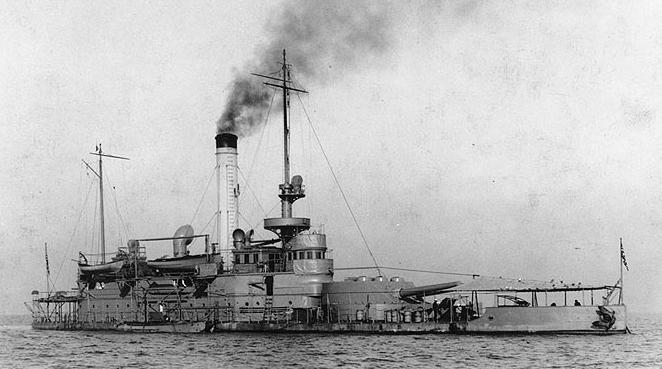
- USS Wyoming

History

United States
- Name: Wyoming (1902–1908); Cheyenne (1909–1937)
- Namesake: The State of Wyoming; Cheyenne, Wyoming
- Ordered: 4 May 1898
- Awarded: 5 October 1898
- Builder: Union Iron Works, San Francisco
- Cost: $1,624,270.59
- Laid down: 11 April 1899
- Launched: 8 September 1900
- Commissioned: 8 December 1902
- Decommissioned: 1 June 1926
- Renamed: Cheyenne, 1 January 1909
- Stricken: 25 January 1937
- Identification: Hull symbol:M-10; Hull Symbol:BM-10, 17 July 1920; Hull symbol:IX-4, 1 July 1921
- Fate: Sold for scrap, 20 April 1939

General characteristics
- Type: Arkansas-class monitor
- Displacement: 3,225 long tons (3,277 t) (standard); 3,356 long tons (3,410 t) (full load)
- Length: 255 feet 1 inch (77.75 m) (overall); 252 ft (77 m) (waterline)
- Beam: 50 ft (15 m)
- Draft: 12 ft 6 in (3.81 m) (mean)
- Installed power: 4 × Babcock & Wilcox boilers; 2,400 indicated horsepower (1,800 kW); 2,336 ihp (1,742 kW) (on trials)
- Propulsion: 2 × Vertical triple expansion engines; 2 × screw propellers
- Speed: 12.5 knots (23.2 km/h; 14.4 mph) (design); 12.4 kn (23.0 km/h; 14.3 mph) (on trial)
- Complement: 13 officers 209 men
- Armament: 2 × 12 in (305 mm)/40 caliber breech-loading rifles (1×2); 4 × 4 in (102 mm)/40 cal guns (4×1); 3 × 6-pounder 57 mm (2.2 in) guns
- Armor: Harvey armor; Side belt: 11–5 in (280–130 mm); Barbette: 11–9 in (280–230 mm); Gun turret: 10–9 in (250–230 mm); Deck: 1.5 in (38 mm); Conning tower: 8 in (200 mm)

Service record
- Part of: United States Pacific Fleet (1913–1917); Atlantic Fleet (1917–1918); United States Navy Reserve (1925)
- Operations: Panamanian Independence (1903); World War I (1917–1919)

USS Wyoming was the second ship of the United States Navy to bear that name, but the first to bear it in honor of the 44th state. The first Wyoming was named for Wyoming Valley in eastern Pennsylvania.

Wyoming was ordered on 4 May 1898, and awarded to the Union Iron Works, San Francisco, 5 October 1898. The keel of Monitor No. 10 was laid down on 11 April 1898. She was launched on 8 September 1900 sponsored by Miss Hattie Warren, daughter of Senator Francis E. Warren of Wyoming, and commissioned at the Mare Island Naval Shipyard, Vallejo, California, on 8 December 1902. The total cost for the hull, machinery, armor and armament was $1,624,270.59.

In 1909, the ship was renamed Cheyenne to free her original name for a new battleship and she was allocated the hull number M-10, which was altered to BM-10 in 1920 and ultimately IX-4 in 1921. She was ultimately sold for scrap in 1939.

== Design ==
The Arkansas-class monitors had been designed to combine a heavy striking power with easy concealment and negligible target area. They had a displacement of 3,225 long tons (3,277 t; 3,612 short tons), measured 255 feet 1 inch (77.75 m) in overall length, with a beam of 50 feet 1 inch (15.27 m) and a draft of 12 feet 6 inches (3.81 m). She was manned by a total crew of 13 officers and 209 men.

Wyoming, the first ship in the fleet to be converted to oil power, was powered by two vertical triple expansion engines driving two screw propellers with steam generated by four Babcock & Wilcox boilers. The engines in Wyoming were designed to produce 2,400 indicated horsepower (1,800 kW) with a top speed of 12.5 knots (23.2 km/h; 14.4 mph), however, on sea trials she was only able to produce 2,336 ihp (1,742 kW) with a top speed of 12.4 kn (23.0 km/h; 14.3 mph). Wyoming was designed to provide a range of 2,360 nautical miles (4,370 km; 2,720 mi) at 10 kn (19 km/h; 12 mph).

The ship was armed with a main battery of two 12-inch (305 mm)/40 caliber guns, either Mark 3 or Mark 4, in a Mark 4 turret. The secondary battery consisted of four 4-inch (102 mm)/50 caliber Mark 7 guns along with three 6-pounder 57 mm (2.2 in) guns. The main belt armor was 11 in (280 mm) in the middle tapering to 5 in (130 mm) at the ends. The gun turrets were between 10 and 9 in (250 and 230 mm), with 11 to 9 in (280 to 230 mm) barbettes. Wyoming also had a 1.5 in (38 mm) deck.

== Service history ==
=== Wyoming ===
After fitting out at Mare Island, Wyoming ran her trials and exercises in San Pablo Bay and San Francisco Bay and conducted exercises and target practice off the southern California coast through the summer of 1903 before she headed south in the autumn, reaching Acapulco, Mexico, on 31 October. She subsequently shifted further south, to Colombia, where a civil war and a rebellion in the Panamanian territory instigated by the United States government, took part in the independence of the Panamanian territory from Colombia, to later build the Panama Canal. The monitor accordingly arrived in Panamanian waters on 13 November and sailed up the Tuira River in company with the protected cruiser Boston, with a company of Marines under Lieutenant S.A.M. Patterson, USMC, and Lieutenant C.B. Taylor, USMC, embarked, to land at Yariza and observe the movements of Colombian troops.

The presence of American armed might there and elsewhere ultimately aided in independence for the Panamanians. During that time, Wyoming anchored at the Bay of San Miguel, Panama, on 15 December. The following day, a boat with 11 Marines embarked for the port of La Palma, Panama, under sail. While Boston departed the scene on 17 December, Wyoming shifted to La Palma on the following day. There, Lieutenant Patterson, USMC, with a detachment of 25 marines, commandeered the steamer Tuira and took her upriver. While the Marines were gone, a party of evacuated American nationals came out to the monitor in her gig. Meanwhile, Patterson's Marines had joined the ship's landing force at the village of Real to keep an eye on American interests there. Back at La Palma, Wyoming continued to take on board American nationals fleeing from the troubled land and kept up a steady stream of supplies to her landing party of bluejackets and Marines at Real. Ultimately, when the need for them had passed, the landing party returned to the ship on Christmas Eve. Wyoming remained in Panamanian waters into the spring of 1904 keeping a figurative eye on local conditions before she departed Panama Bay on 19 April, bound for Acapulco, Mexico. After remaining at that port from 27 to 29 April, Wyoming visited Pichilinque, Mexico from 3 to 9 May. She subsequently reached San Diego, on 14 May for a nine-day stay.

For the remainder of 1904, Wyoming operated off the West Coast, ranging from Brighton Beach, California, and Ventura, California, to Bellingham, Washington, and Portland, Oregon. She attended a regatta at Astoria, Oregon, from 22 to 27 August and later took part in ceremonies at the "unveiling of monuments" at Griffin Bay, San Juan Islands and Roche Harbor before she entered the Puget Sound Navy Yard, Bremerton, Washington, on 22 October. Wyoming was overhauled there into the following year. She departed the Pacific Northwest on 26 January 1905 and steamed via San Francisco to Magdalena Bay, Mexico, for target practice. Later cruising to Acapulco and Panamanian waters, Wyoming also operated off San Salvador and Port Harford, California, before she returned to Mare Island on 30 July to be decommissioned on 29 August 1905.

Recommissioned on 8 October 1908 with Commander John J. Knapp in command, Wyoming spent over two months at Mare Island refitting. Converted to fuel oil – the first ship to do so in the United States Navy – she underwent tests for her oil-burning installation at San Francisco, Santa Barbara, California, and San Diego, into March 1909. During those tests, Wyoming was renamed Cheyenne on 1 January 1909, in order to clear the name Wyoming for the projected Battleship No. 32. The ship consequently underwent more tests on her oil-burning equipment at Santa Barbara, San Pedro, and San Diego before she was placed in reserve at Mare Island on 8 June. She was decommissioned on 13 November of the same year.

=== Cheyenne ===
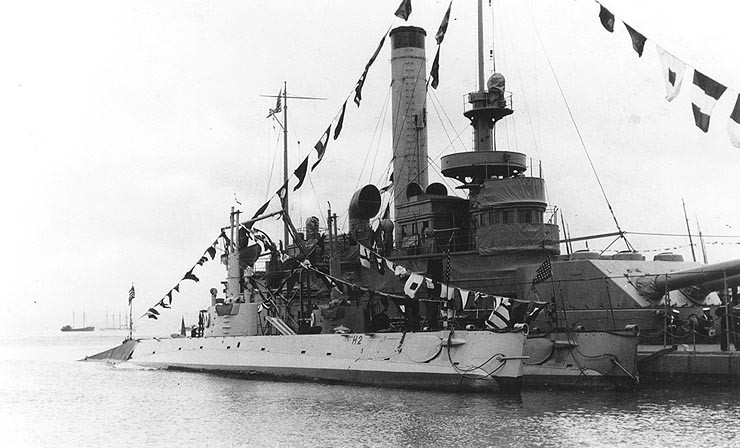
USS Cheyenne with submarines USS H-1 and H-2 alongside

Recommissioned, in reserve, on 11 July 1910, Lieutenant Commander Charles Trusedale Owens in command, Cheyenne was assigned to the Washington Naval Militia in 1911 and operated in an "in commission, in reserve" status into 1913. Shifting to the Puget Sound Navy Yard early in February 1913, Cheyenne was fitted out as a submarine tender over the ensuing months. Finally, on 20 August 1913, Cheyenne was placed in "full commission". The newly converted submarine tender operated in the Puget Sound region until 11 December, when she sailed for San Francisco. In the ensuing months, Cheyenne tended the submarines of the Second Submarine Division, Pacific Torpedo Flotilla, at Mare Island, San Francisco, and San Pedro, into April 1914. Later that spring, when troubled conditions in Mexico threatened American lives and property, Cheyenne interrupted her submarine tending duties twice, once in late April and once in mid-May, to embark refugees at Ensenada, Mexico, and San Quentin, Mexico, transporting them both times to San Diego.

Cheyenne then resumed her submarine tending operations on the West Coast, continuing them into 1917. On 10 April of that year, four days after the U.S. entered World War I, she proceeded to Port Angeles, Washington, the designated point of mobilization for the Pacific Fleet, in company with the submarines H-1 and H-2, arriving there on 16 April. Subsequently, shifting to the Puget Sound Navy Yard, Cheyenne remained at that port for most of a month taking on stores and provisions loading ammunition and receiving men on board to fill the vacancies in her complement. On 28 April Cheyenne guarded N-1 as she ran trials off Port Townsend, Washington. On 4 May, the warship returned to Puget Sound for drydock and yard work. Completing that refit late in May, Cheyenne shifted southward to San Pedro, Los Angeles, where she established a submarine base and training camp for personnel for submarine duty. Cheyenne subsequently joined the Atlantic Fleet, serving as flagship and tender for Division 3, Flotilla 1, Submarine Force, Atlantic Fleet. On 17 December 1918, the ship was transferred to Division 1, American Patrol Detachment. While with that force, Cheyenne lay at Tampico, Mexico, protecting American lives and property from 16 January to 9 October 1919. Proceeding north soon thereafter, the warship arrived at the Philadelphia Navy Yard on 23 October 1919, where she was decommissioned on 3 January 1920.

While inactive at Philadelphia, the ship was classified as a miscellaneous auxiliary, under the hull number IX-4, in the fleetwide designation of alphanumeric hull classification symbols of 17 July 1920. Subsequently, recommissioned at Philadelphia on 22 September of the same year, Cheyenne was towed to Baltimore, Maryland, by the tug Lykens. Based there, Cheyenne was assigned to training duty with Naval Reserve Force (USNRF) personnel of subdistrict "A" of the Fifth Naval District, and trained USNRF reservists through 1925. Based at Baltimore, she occasionally visited Hampton Roads during her cruises. On 21 January 1926, the minesweeper Owl took Cheyenne in tow and took her to Norfolk, Virginia, and thence to Philadelphia, where she arrived on 27 January for inactivation. Decommissioned on 1 June 1926, Cheyenne was struck from the Naval Vessel Register on 25 January 1937, and her stripped-down hulk was sold for scrap on 20 April 1939.

== Bibliography ==
- Friedman, Norman (2011). Naval Weapons of World War One: Guns, Torpedoes, Mines and ASW Weapons of All Nations; An Illustrated Directory. Barnsley: Seaforth Publishing. ISBN 978-1-84832-100-7.
- Friedman, Norman (1985). U.S. Battleships: An Illustrated Design History. Annapolis, Maryland: Naval Institute Press. ISBN 978-1-59114-247-8.
- Grobmeier, Alvin H. (1990). "Question 2/89". Warship International. XXVII (2): 198–199. ISSN 0043-0374.
- Ships' Data, U. S. Naval Vessels, 1911-. US Naval Department. 1 January 1914.
- Schmidt, Carl H. (1921). "Navy Yearbook". Senate Documents No. 302. 11. Washington, D.C.: U.S. Government Printing Office: 744.
- DiGiulian, Tony (9 May 2015). "United States of America 12"/40 (30.5 cm) Mark 3 and Mark 4". Navweaps.
- DiGiulian, Tony (15 June 2015). "United States of America 4"/50 (10.2 cm) Marks 7, 8, 9 and 10". Navweaps.
- Yarnall, Paul R. (23 March 2016). "M-8 USS Nevada". NavSource.
- DANFS (4 November 2015). "Wyoming". Naval History and Heritage Command.
