= USS Ohio (BB-12) =

Pre-dreadnought battleship of the United States Navy

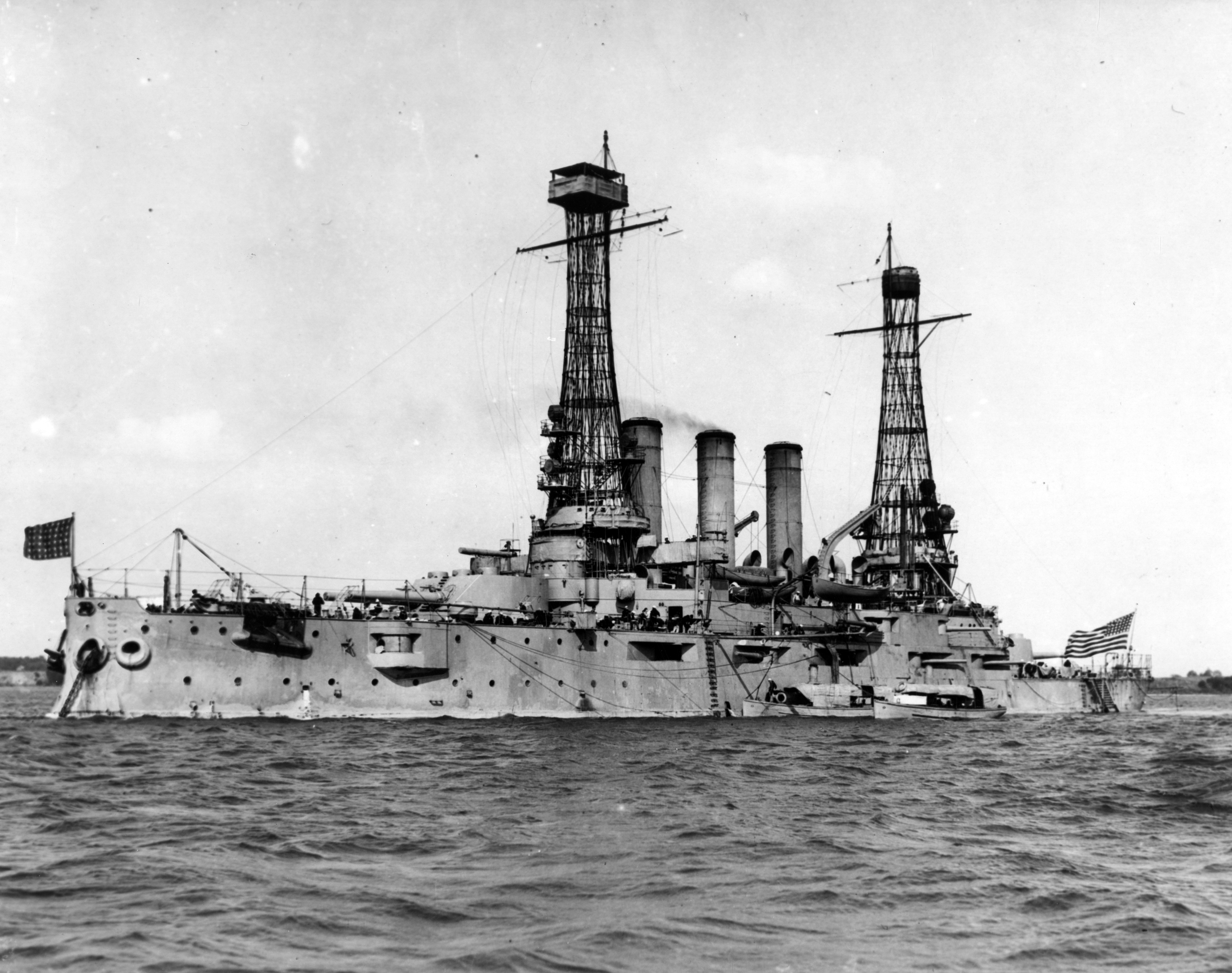
- USS Ohio (BB-12) at anchor

History

United States
- Name: Ohio
- Namesake: Ohio
- Builder: Union Iron Works
- Laid down: 22 April 1899
- Launched: 18 May 1901
- Commissioned: 4 October 1904
- Decommissioned: July 1919
- Stricken: 31 May 1922
- Fate: Sold for scrap, March 1923

General characteristics
- Class & type: Maine-class battleship
- Displacement: Normal: 12,723 long tons (12,927 t); Full load: 13,700 long tons (13,900 t)
- Length: 393 ft 10 in (120.04 m)
- Beam: 72 ft 3 in (22.02 m)
- Draft: 23 ft 10 in (7.26 m)
- Installed power: 12 × Thornycroft boilers; 16,000 ihp (12,000 kW)
- Propulsion: 2 × triple-expansion steam engines; 2 × screw propellers
- Speed: 18 kn (21 mph; 33 km/h)
- Complement: 561 officers and enlisted
- Armament: 4 × 12 in (305 mm)/40 caliber guns; 16 × 6 in (152 mm)/50 cal Mark 6 guns; 8 × 3-pounders (47 mm (1.9 in)); 6 × 1-pounders (37 mm (1.5 in)); 2 × 18 in (457 mm) torpedo tubes
- Armor: Belt: 8 to 11 in (203 to 279 mm); Turrets: 12 in (305 mm); Casemates: 6 in (152 mm); Conning tower: 10 in (254 mm)

USS Ohio (hull number: BB-12), a Maine-class pre-dreadnought battleship, was the third ship of her class and the third ship of the United States Navy to be named for the 17th state. She was laid down at the Union Iron Works shipyard in San Francisco in April 1899, was launched in May 1901, and was commissioned into the fleet in October 1904. She was armed with a main battery of four 12-inch (305 mm) guns and could steam at a top speed of 18 knots (33 km/h; 21 mph).

Ohio initially served in the Asiatic Fleet, from 1905 to 1907, when she returned to the United States. In December that year, she joined the Great White Fleet for its world cruise, which lasted until early 1909. She served with the Atlantic Fleet for the next four years conducting a peacetime training routine. In 1914, she was sent to Mexico to protect American interests in the country during the Mexican Revolution. She served as a training ship during America's involvement in World War I from 1917 to 1918. Thoroughly obsolete by that time, Ohio was decommissioned in July 1919, and was ultimately sold for scrap in March 1923 under the terms of the Washington Naval Treaty.

== Description ==
The United States Congress passed a major naval construction program in response to the outbreak of the Spanish–American War in 1898; the program included three new battleships, which were to become the Maine class. The class incorporated several significant technological developments, including smaller caliber main guns that used smokeless powder to achieve greater muzzle velocity (and thus penetrating power), Krupp cemented armor that was stronger than Harvey armor used on earlier vessels, and water-tube boilers that provided more power for the engines.

Plan and profile drawing of the Maine class

Ohio was 393 feet 11 inches (120.07 m) long overall and had a beam of 72 ft 3 in (22.02 m) and a draft of 24 ft 4 in (7.42 m). She displaced 12,723 long tons (12,927 t) as designed and up to 13,700 long tons (13,900 t) at full load. The ship was powered by two-shaft triple-expansion steam engines rated at 16,000 indicated horsepower (12,000 kW), driving two screw propellers. Steam was provided by twelve coal-fired Thornycroft boilers, which were vented into three funnels. The propulsion system generated a top speed of 18 knots (33 km/h; 21 mph). As built, she was fitted with heavy military masts, but these were quickly replaced by cage masts in 1909. She had a crew of 561 officers and enlisted men, which increased to 779–813.

The ship was armed with a main battery of four 12 in (305 mm) /40 caliber (Note: /40 refers to the length of the gun in terms of calibers. A /40 gun is 40 times long as it is in bore diameter.) guns in two twin gun turrets on the centerline, one forward and aft. The secondary battery consisted of sixteen 6 in (152 mm) /50 caliber Mark 6 guns, which were placed in casemates in the hull. For close-range defense against torpedo boats, she carried six 3 in (76 mm) /50 caliber guns mounted in casemates along the side of the hull, eight 3-pounder guns, and six 1-pounder guns. As was standard for capital ships of the period, Ohio carried two 18 in (457 mm) torpedo tubes, submerged in her hull on the broadside.

Ohio's main armored belt was 11 in (279 mm) thick over the magazines and the propulsion machinery spaces and 8 in (203 mm) elsewhere. The main battery gun turrets had 12-inch (305 mm) thick faces, and the supporting barbettes had the same thickness of armor plating on their exposed sides. Armor that was 6 in thick protected the secondary battery. The conning tower had 10 in (254 mm) thick sides.

== Service history ==
Ohio, the final member of the Maine class of pre-dreadnought battleships, was the second ship of the three to be laid down. She was built at the Union Iron Works in San Francisco, with her keel being laid on 22 April 1899. She was launched on 18 May 1901 and was commissioned on 4 October 1904. After she entered service, Ohio was assigned as the flagship of the Asiatic Fleet. She left San Francisco on 1 April, bound for Manila in the Philippines. After the new battleship arrived, the party of then-Secretary of War William Howard Taft came aboard for a tour of East Asia, including stops in Japan and China. Ohio returned to the United States in 1907 and was transferred to the Atlantic Fleet. She and the rest of the Atlantic Fleet battleships held a naval review for President Theodore Roosevelt in Hampton Roads, Virginia to mark the start of the cruise of the Great White Fleet on 16 December 1907. The cruise of the Great White Fleet was conceived as a way to demonstrate American military power, particularly to Japan. Tensions had begun to rise between the United States and Japan after the latter's victory in the Russo-Japanese War in 1905, particularly over racist opposition to Japanese immigration to the United States. The press in both countries began to call for war, and Roosevelt hoped to use the demonstration of naval might to deter Japanese aggression.

The following day, the fleet steamed out of Hampton Roads and cruised south to the Caribbean and then to South America, making stops in Port of Spain, Rio de Janeiro, Punta Arenas, and Valparaíso, among other cities. After arriving in Mexico in March 1908, the fleet spent three weeks conducting gunnery practice. The fleet then resumed its voyage up the Pacific coast of the Americas, stopping in San Francisco and Seattle before crossing the Pacific to Australia, stopping in Hawaii on the way. Stops in the South Pacific included Melbourne, Sydney, and Auckland. After leaving Australia, the fleet turned north for the Philippines, stopping in Manila, before continuing on to Japan where a welcoming ceremony was held in Yokohama. Three weeks of exercises followed in Subic Bay in the Philippines in November. The ships passed Singapore on 6 December and entered the Indian Ocean; they coaled in Colombo before proceeding to the Suez Canal and coaling again at Port Said, Egypt. The fleet called in several Mediterranean ports before stopping in Gibraltar, where an international fleet of British, Russian, French, and Dutch warships greeted the Americans. The ships then crossed the Atlantic to return to Hampton Roads on 22 February 1909, having traveled 46,729 nautical miles (86,542 km; 53,775 mi). There, they conducted a naval review for Roosevelt.

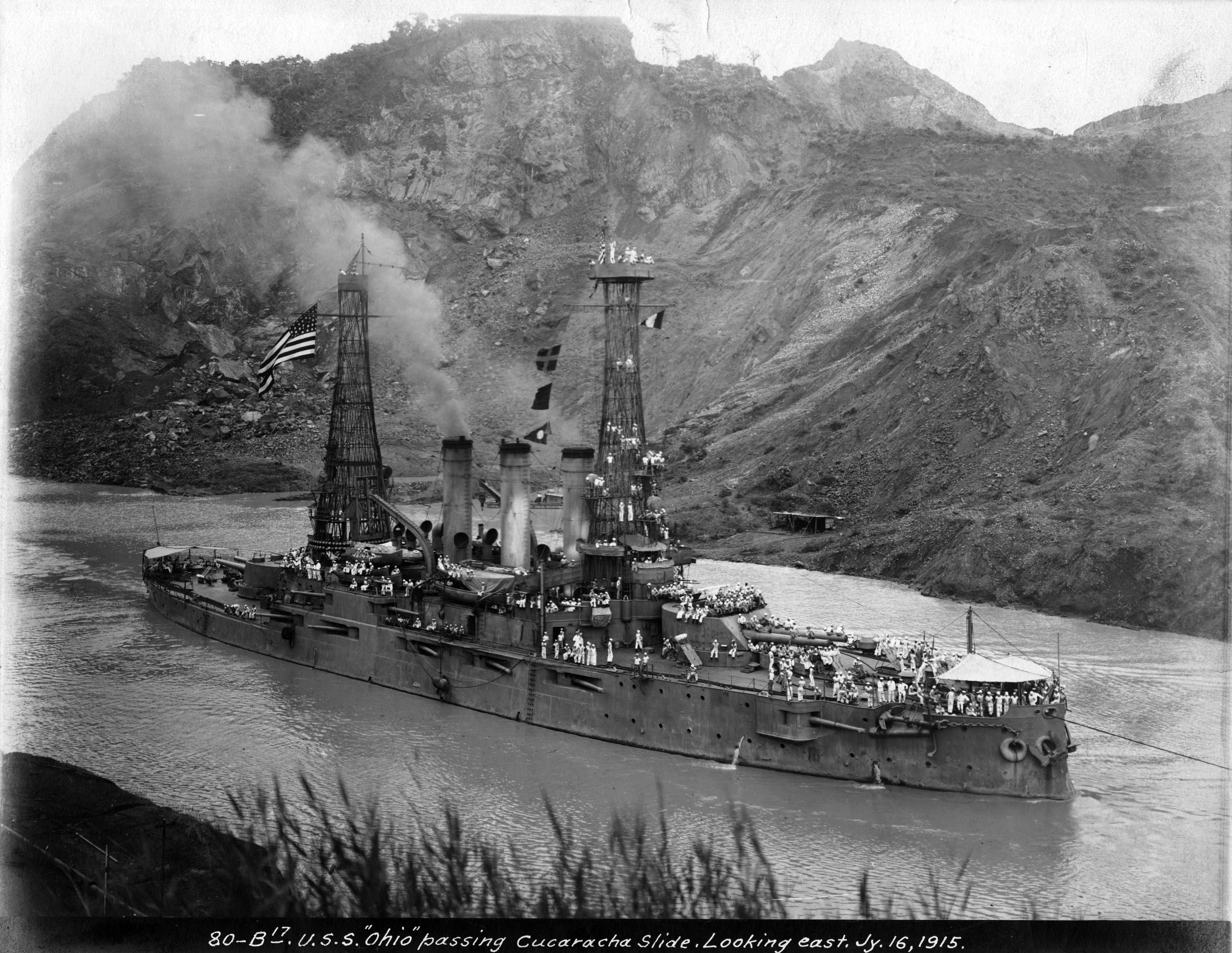
Ohio transiting the Panama Canal on 16 July 1915 during a midshipmen training cruise

Following the conclusion of the ceremonies, Ohio proceeded to New York, where she was based for the following four years. This time was spent conducting normal peacetime training with the fleet and assisting in the training of the New York Naval Militia. By 1914, the worsening conditions during the Mexican Civil War prompted the United States to begin intervening in the conflict. Ohio was sent to Mexican waters early that year to protect American interests in the country. In mid-1914, she returned to the east coast of the United States to conduct a training cruise for midshipmen from the US Naval Academy. After completing the cruise, Ohio was transferred to the Reserve Fleet based at Philadelphia. She returned to service only to conduct additional midshipmen cruises in the summers of 1915 and 1916.

The United States had initially remained neutral during World War I, but by early 1917, tensions between it and Germany rose as the latter's unrestricted submarine warfare campaign began to sink American merchants ships. On 6 April 1917, the United States declared war on Germany, and on the 24th, Ohio was recommissioned. She was based in Norfolk and tasked with training crews for the rapidly expanding wartime fleet. This service included gunnery training; on 1 June 1918, she was involved in a significant accident during gunnery practice with two other battleships, New Hampshire and Louisiana. Gunners aboard New Hampshire accidentally began firing at a pair of submarine chasers. Ohio issued a "cease fire" warning, though it was not immediately received aboard New Hampshire before one shell struck Louisiana. While the ships stopped to assess the damage, lookouts aboard Ohio reported an enemy submarine, prompting several salvos from the secondary batteries of Ohio and New Hampshire, though the submarine chasers found no evidence of a submarine upon investigating the scene.

Following the German surrender in November 1918, most of the battleships of the Atlantic Fleet were used as transports to ferry American soldiers back from France. Ohio and her sisters were not so employed, however, owing to their short range and small size, which would not permit sufficient additional accommodations. Instead, she was sent to Philadelphia on 28 November and remained inactive there until 7 January 1919, when she was placed back in reserve. On 17 July, the ship was reclassified as BB-12. The old battleship Iowa (by then renamed as Coast Battleship No. 4) was converted into a radio-controlled target ship, and Ohio was employed as her first control vessel. Ohio controlled the vessel remotely on a voyage from Philadelphia to Hampton Roads for initial tests in August 1920. The two vessels conducted experiments there until 10 September.

In June 1921, the Navy and Army conducted a series of bombing tests off the Virginia Capes to evaluate the effectiveness of aircraft against warships. Ohio was again used to control Coast Battleship No. 4 during the experiments, steaming astern of the target ship along with several other vessels to simulate a fleet underway. The ability of the ship to maneuver significantly hindered the aircrews' ability to locate and attack the vessel. Following the 1922 Washington Naval Treaty, which mandated significant reductions in naval armaments, Ohio was stricken from the naval register on 31 May 1922 and sold for scrap on 24 March 1923.
