= USS Vreeland =

United States Navy Knox-class frigate

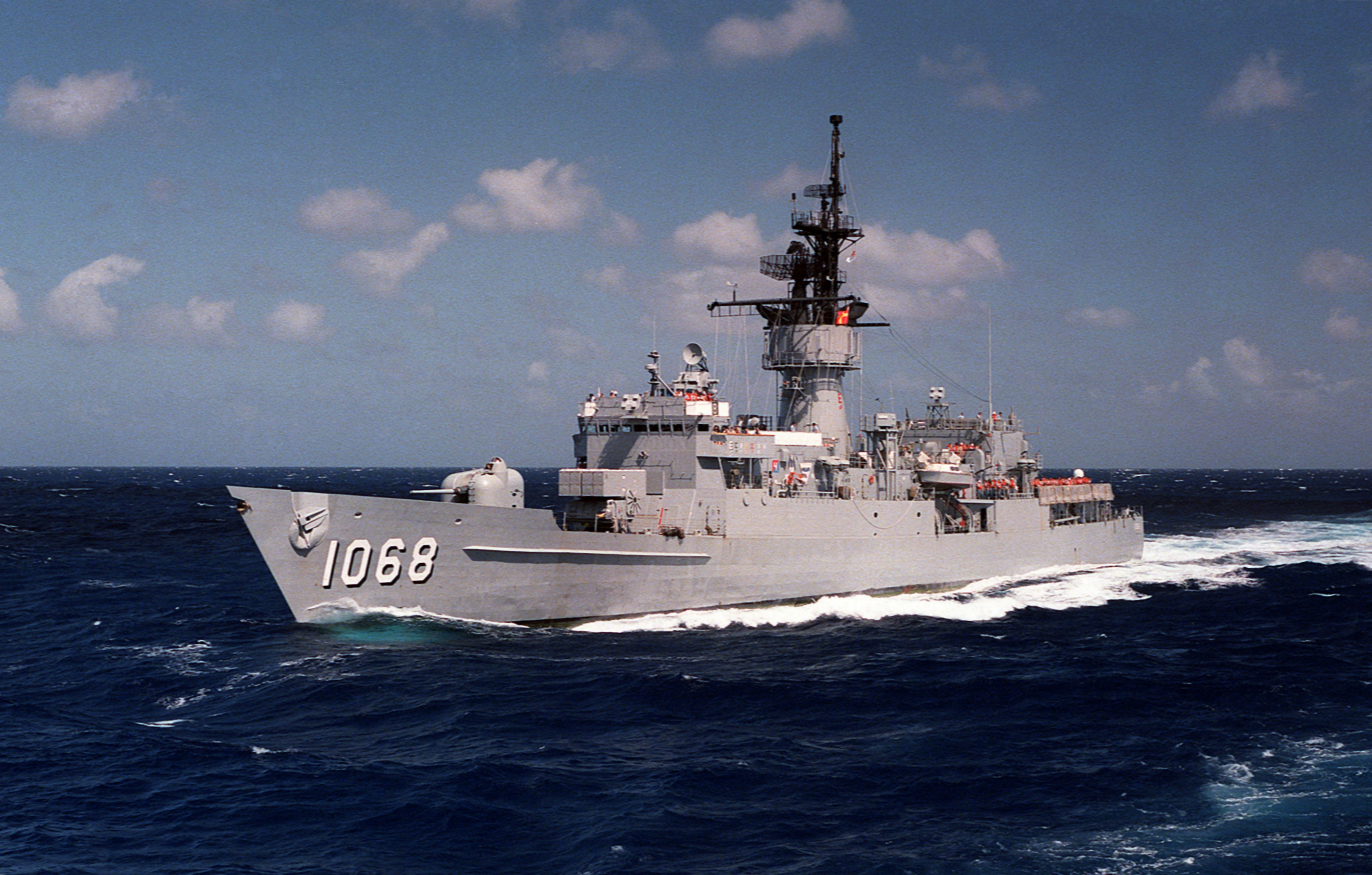
- USS Vreeland (FF-1068)

History

United States
- Name: USS Vreeland (DE-1068)
- Namesake: Charles E. Vreeland
- Ordered: 22 July 1964
- Builder: Avondale Shipyard, Westwego, Louisiana
- Yard number: 1073
- Laid down: 20 March 1968
- Launched: 14 June 1969
- Sponsored by: Mrs. Jamie L. Whitten
- Acquired: 30 May 1970
- Commissioned: 13 June 1970
- Reclassified: FF-1068, 1 July 1975

History
- Decommissioned: 30 June 1992
- Motto: Quo fas et Gloria Ducunt (English: Where duty and glory lead)
- Fate: Transferred to Greece, 30 June 1992
- Stricken: 11 January 1995

History

Greece
- Name: Macedonia (F458)
- Acquired: 30 June 1992
- Decommissioned: January 1999

General characteristics
- Class & type: Knox-class frigate
- Displacement: 3,208 tons (4,189 full load)
- Length: 438 ft (133.5 m)
- Beam: 46 ft 9 in (14.25 m)
- Draft: 24 ft 9 in (7.6 m)
- Propulsion: 2 × BW 1200psi boilers; 1 Westinghouse geared turbine; 1 shaft, 35,000 SHP (26 MW)
- Speed: over 27 knots (50 km/h)
- Endurance: 4,500 nautical miles @ 20 knots (8,300 km @ 37 km/h)
- Complement: 18 officers, 267 enlisted
- Sensors & processing systems: AN/SPS-40 Air Search Radar; AN/SPS-67 Surface Search Radar; AN/SQS-26 Sonar; AN/SQR-18 Towed array sonar system; AN/SQR-17AV(2)Sonar Signal Processor (LAMPs Mk II - Sea Sprite Helo); AN/SKR-4A Signal Receiver for data link to Helo; Mk68 Gun Fire Control System
- Electronic warfare & decoys: AN/SLQ-32 Electronics Warfare System
- Armament: one Mk-16 8 cell missile launcher for ASROC and Harpoon missiles; one Mk-42 5-inch/54 caliber gun; Mark 46 torpedoes from four single tube launchers); one Mk-25 BPDMS launcher for Sea Sparrow missiles, replaced by Phalanx CIWS
- Aircraft carried: one SH-2 Seasprite (LAMPS I) helicopter

USS Vreeland (FF-1068) was a Knox-class frigate of the United States Navy. The ship was named for Rear Admiral Charles E. Vreeland (1852–1916).

Vreeland (DE-1068) was laid down on 20 March 1968 by the Avondale Shipyard at Westwego, La.; launched on 16 June 1969; sponsored by Mrs. Jamie L. Whitten, wife of the Congressman representing Mississippi's 2nd Congressional district; and commissioned at Charleston, S.C., on 13 June 1970.

== Operational history ==
After fitting out at Charleston and shakedown training in the West Indies, Vreeland returned to Charleston to join Destroyer Squadron (DesRon) 4. She completed repairs in February 1971 and final contract trials in March and then began preparations for her first deployment to the Mediterranean area. The warship departed Charleston on 15 April and arrived in Rota, Spain, on the 25th. During the next six months, she steamed the length and breadth of the "middle sea" as a unit of the 6th Fleet. She visited numerous ports and participated in a host of exercises with American and Allied naval forces. She concluded that tour of duty at Gibraltar on 8 October when she changed operational control back to the 2d Fleet and headed home. The warship arrived in Charleston on the 16th and resumed 2d Fleet operations out of Charleston.

=== Mediterranean Sea ===
In the summer of 1972, the ship began preparations for another cruise in the Mediterranean Sea. That deployment, however, proved different than the previous one. Rather than deploying for six months and then returning home to Charleston, Vreeland received orders changing her home port to Athens. That assignment lasted for the next three years rather than the normal six months and included the relocation of Vreeland dependents to Athens—all as a part of the Navy's forward deployment program. During those three years, she performed the normal duties of a unit of the 6th Fleet, visiting ports, conducting exercises, and performing surveillance of Soviet ships operating in the Mediterranean.

=== Reclassification and overhaul ===
On 1 July 1975, Vreeland was reclassified a frigate and redesignated FF-1068. Three days later, she departed Greece to begin her voyage back to the United States. The warship concluded that voyage, and her three-year deployment, at Philadelphia on 30 July. After post-deployment standdown, she moved south to Norfolk in September for repairs but returned to Philadelphia in October in time to participate in the Navy's 200th birthday celebration on the 13th. Duty as a surface warfare school ship and more repairs at Norfolk followed.

On 6 December, the frigate entered the Philadelphia Naval Shipyard, where she spent the following year undergoing a major overhaul, which she completed on 2 December 1976. The warship resumed duty as an active unit of the Fleet early in 1977. Refresher training and various qualification exercises out of her new home port of Mayport, Florida, occupied her during the first six months of 1977. On 25 July, she departed Mayport for a cruise to South America to participate in UNITAS XVIII, the annual series of exercises in which units of various South American navies join the United States Navy in practicing the skills of hemispheric defense. In November, she concluded her UNITAS cruise and reentered Mayport on the 25th. Leave and upkeep in port took up her time for the remainder of the year.

=== Middle East ===
A part of January and February 1978 was devoted to a restricted availability for Vreeland. The frigate devoted the ensuing months to preparations for her forthcoming deployment to the Middle East. Vreeland departed from Mayport on 23 July in company with Mullinix (DD-944). Following fuel stops at Bermuda, the Azores, and Rota, Spain, the ships transited the Mediterranean and the Suez Canal and arrived at Port Sudan, Sudan, on 9 August. A turnover from Glover (AGFF-1) and Barney (DDG-6) was effected, and Vreeland joined the Middle East Force. The remainder of the year was spent in operations with that group. On 31 December, Vreeland and Mullinix retransited the Suez Canal on their return to the United States.

During evacuation of the PLO from Beirut, Lebanon in August 1982, Vreeland provided an emergency underway replenishment (UNREP) to the Greek ferry Nereus carrying armed PLO evacuees. This unusual operation required Vreeland to pull up directly astern of Nereus and provide a fire hose to connect both vessels together and allow for the transfer of fresh water from Vreeland.

Medical supplies, food and potable water were transferred to the ferry without significant incident. This aid likely resulted in the transit to South Yemen being completed without loss of control of the ferry by the Greek crew to PLO evacuees.

1985 North Atlantic Cruise / Ocean Safari 1985

1986 Libyan Expedition / Line of Death / Operation Attainment Document III / Operation EL-Dorado Canyon

=== Operations Just Cause, Desert Shield and Desert Storm ===
Vreeland participated in Operation Just Cause (United States invasion of Panama), 20 December 1989 – 31 January 1990.

In December 1990, Vreeland departed Mayport, Florida, to take part in Operation Desert Storm, 17 January – 28 February 1991. During Vreeland's transit to the Persian Gulf, members of the crew were assigned to the Multi-national Interception Force. This MIF team was divided into two groups; MIF teams blue and gold. The purpose of this group was to board merchant vessels to ensure cargo was in compliance with United Nations trade embargoes imposed on Iraq. MIF conducted more than 41 boardings, and diverted or confiscated tons of contraband.

Vreeland was decommissioned on 30 June 1992. On 11 January 1995, the Vreeland was stricken from the American Naval Vessel Register.

=== Greek service ===
The ship was renamed Macedonia (F458), and leased to Greece under the Foreign Assistance Act, 30 June 1992.

Macedonia was decommissioned from the Hellenic Navy in January 1999.

== Awards, Citations and Campaign Ribbons ==
Combat Action Ribbon
Joint Meritorious Unit Award (with one bronze oak leaf cluster)
Navy Unit Commendation (with one bronze service star)
Navy Meritorious Unit Commendation
Navy "E" Ribbon (3)
Navy Expeditionary Medal (with two bronze service stars)
National Defense Service Medal (with one bronze service star)
Armed Forces Expeditionary Medal
Southwest Asia Service Medal (with two bronze service stars)
Sea Service Deployment Ribbon (with one silver service star (five bronze service stars))
Coast Guard Special Operations Service Ribbon
Kuwait Liberation Medal (Saudi Arabia)
Kuwait Liberation Medal (Kuwait)
