= 12-inch/40-caliber gun =

12"/40 caliber Mark 3 and Mark 4
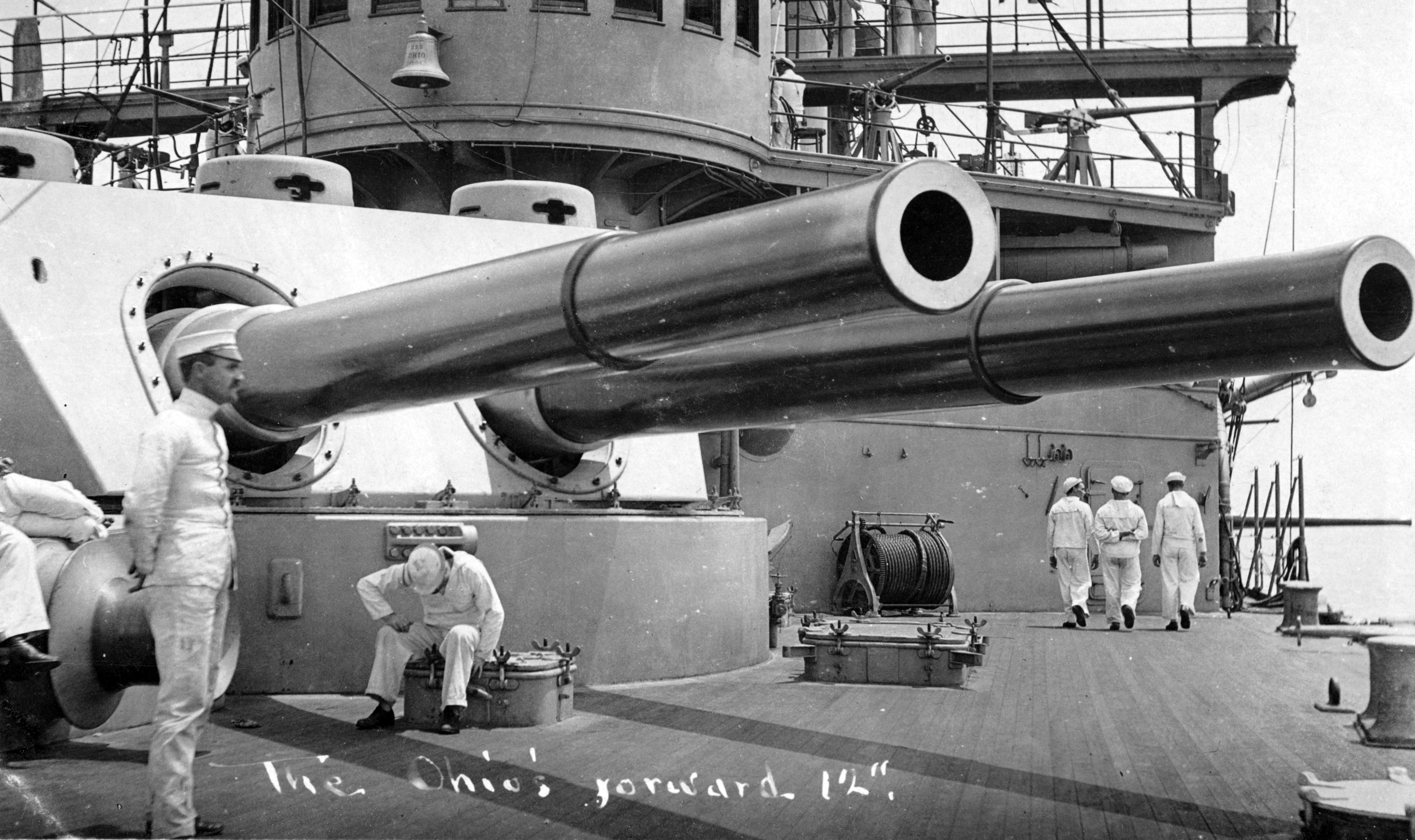
- View of Ohio and her forward 12"/40 caliber guns in the Mark 4 turret in 1916.
- Type: Naval gun
- Place of origin: United States

Service history
- In service: 1902
- Used by: United States Navy
- Wars: World War I

Production history
- Designer: Bureau of Ordnance
- Designed: 1899
- Manufacturer: U.S. Naval Gun Factory
- No. built: Mark 3: 41 (Nos. 15–41, 50–56); Mark 4: 10 (Nos. 49, 58–60, 150–154, 179)
- Variants: Mark 3 and Mark 4

Specifications
- Mass: 116,480 lb (52,830 kg) (with breech); 114,960 lb (52,140 kg) (without breech)
- Barrel length: 40 ft 0 in (12.19 m) bore (40 calibers)
- Shell: 870 lb (390 kg) armor-piercing
- Caliber: 12 in (305 mm)
- Elevation: Mark 4: −3° to +15°; Mark 5: −7° to +20°
- Traverse: −150° to +150°
- Rate of fire: 0.66 rounds per minute (as commissioned); 2 rounds per minute (after 1906)
- Muzzle velocity: 2,800 ft/s (850 m/s) (as commissioned); 2,600 ft/s (790 m/s) (first derating); 2,400 ft/s (730 m/s) (final derating)
- Effective firing range: 19,000 yd (17,374 m) at 15.5° elevation

The 12"/40 caliber gun (spoken as "twelve-inch-forty--caliber") were used for the primary batteries of the United States Navy's last class of monitors and the Maine-class and Virginia-class pre-dreadnought battleships.

== Design ==
The 12-inch (305 mm)/40 caliber gun was developed after the Spanish–American War to use the new smokeless powder that had recently been adopted by the Navy. The Mark 3, gun Nos. 15–48 and 50–56, was constructed of tube, jacket, and eight hoops. It was found that the early guns suffered from excessive bore erosion, in an attempt to fix this the Navy reduced the propellant charges to reduce the muzzle velocity, because of this the Mark 4, gun Nos. 49, 58–60, 150–154, and 179, was similar to the Mark 3 but with a smaller chamber for the reduced propellant charge.

== Service history ==
The guns mounted in the Virginia-class battleships were in an unusual two-level turret with the 8-inch (203 mm)/45 caliber guns on top of the larger 12-inch guns. This arrangement ultimately proved unsuccessful but helped the Navy in the successful development of superfiring turrets later used in the dreadnought South Carolina.

== Incident ==
Gun No. 49, while testing powder at the Naval Proving Ground, had the entire muzzle and chase blow off. The board appointed to investigate came to the conclusion that the new powder, while performing properly, caused a pressure along the chase that was dangerously close to the strength curve. It was decided that when the guns were withdrawn to be relined they would add an additional hoop that extended to the muzzle would be placed on the chase.

== Naval Service ==
Ship	Gun Installed	Gun Mount
USS Arkansas (BM-7)	Mark 3 or 4: 12"/40 caliber	Mark 4: 1 × twin turrets
USS Nevada (BM-8)	Mark 3 or 4: 12"/40 caliber	Mark 4: 1 × twin turrets
USS Florida (BM-9)	Mark 3 or 4: 12"/40 caliber	Mark 4: 1 × twin turrets
USS Wyoming (BM-10)	Mark 3 or 4: 12"/40 caliber	Mark 4: 1 × twin turrets
USS Maine (BB-10)	Mark 3 or 4: 12"/40 caliber	Mark 4: 2 × twin turrets
USS Missouri (BB-11)	Mark 3 or 4: 12"/40 caliber	Mark 4: 2 × twin turrets
USS Ohio (BB-12)	Mark 3 or 4: 12"/40 caliber	Mark 4: 2 × twin turrets
USS Virginia (BB-13)	Mark 3 or 4: 12"/40 caliber	Mark 5: 2 × dual-caliber turrets
USS Nebraska (BB-14)	Mark 3 or 4: 12"/40 caliber	Mark 5: 2 × dual-caliber turrets
USS Georgia (BB-15)	Mark 3 or 4: 12"/40 caliber	Mark 5: 2 × dual-caliber turrets
USS New Jersey (BB-16)	Mark 3 or 4: 12"/40 caliber	Mark 5: 2 × dual-caliber turrets
USS Rhode Island (BB-17)	Mark 3 or 4: 12"/40 caliber	Mark 5: 2 × dual-caliber turrets
