= USS Pasig (AO-89) =

US Navy auxiliary vessel

History

United States
- Name: USS Pasig
- Namesake: Pasig River in the Philippines
- Builder: Newport News Shipbuilding & Drydock Company, Newport News, Virginia
- Laid down: 1917
- Launched: 24 November 1917
- Acquired: 22 January 1943
- Commissioned: 22 January 1943
- Decommissioned: 25 September 1943
- Stricken: 11 October 1943
- Fate: Returned to owner; Scrapped, 1947

General characteristics
- Type: Fleet replenishment oiler
- Displacement: 7,165 long tons (7,280 t) light
- Length: 516 ft 6 in (157.43 m)
- Beam: 68 ft (21 m)
- Draft: 30 ft 10 in (9.40 m)
- Propulsion: Triple expansion reciprocating engine; 3 single ended Scotch boilers; Single shaft; 2,400 shp (1,790 kW)
- Speed: 10.5 knots (19.4 km/h; 12.1 mph)
- Armament: 1 × 4 in (100 mm) gun

USS Pasig (AO-89) was a fleet replenishment oiler in the service of the United States Navy. The lone ship in her class, she was the first of only two U.S. Naval vessels to be named for the Pasig River which flows through Manila on the Philippine Island of Luzon.

== Service history ==
Originally built in 1917 by the Newport News Shipbuilding & Drydock Company of Newport News, Virginia, she served the Atlantic Refining Company of Philadelphia, Pennsylvania as SS J. C. Donnell. Acquired by the US Navy through the War Shipping Administration on 22 January 1943, and commissioned the same day, as USS Pasig (AO–89).

Pasig was intended for use as a storage tank in the South Pacific near New Caledonia, but was replaced by concrete barges. She decommissioned and was delivered to WSA on 25 September 1943, and was struck from the Naval Vessel Register on 11 October 1943.

Returned to her owner, Pasig reverted to her original name and served as SS J.C. Donnell until scrapped in 1947.

== See also ==
- List of auxiliaries of the United States Navy
