= 4-inch/50-caliber gun =

4″/50 caliber gun Marks 7, 8, 9, and 10
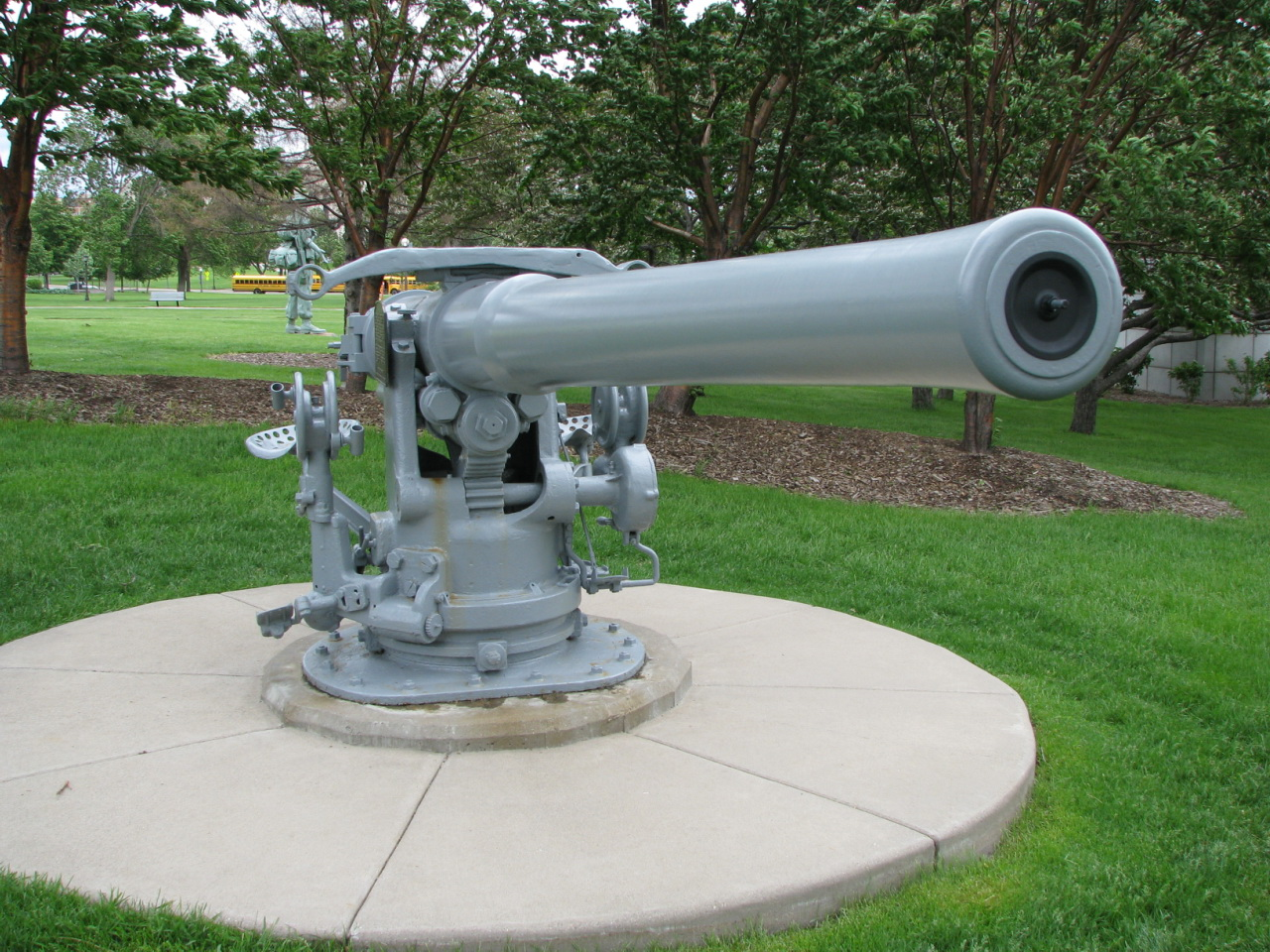
- The gun from USS Ward which fired the first American shot of World War II at Pearl Harbor on 7 December 1941 at the State Capitol grounds in St. Paul, Minnesota.
- Type: Naval gun
- Place of origin: United States

Service history
- In service: 1898–1945
- Used by: United States Navy; Royal Navy; Royal Canadian Navy; Soviet Navy
- Wars: World War I; World War II

Production history
- Designer: Bureau of Ordnance
- Designed: Mark 7: 1898; Mark 8: 1905; Mark 9: 1914; Mark 10: 1914 (Did not enter service)
- Manufacturer: U.S. Naval Gun Factory; Bethlehem Steel; Midvale Steel; British and American Mfg. Co.; Watervliet Arsenal; Root & VanDervoort; American Radiator Corp.; Poole Engineering
- No. built: Mark 7: 89; Mark 8: 12; Mark 9: 2,988; Mark 10: 1
- Variants: Mark 7, 8, 9 and 10

Specifications
- Mass: Mark 7: 5,808 lb (2,634 kg) (with breech); Mark 8: 6,440 lb (2,920 kg) (with breech); Mark 9: 5,900 lb (2,700 kg) (with breech); Mark 10: 6,860 lb (3,110 kg) (with breech)
- Length: Mark 7: 204.5 in (5,190 mm); Mark 8 and 9: 206.53 in (5,246 mm); Mark 10: 211 in (5,400 mm)
- Barrel length: All: 200 in (5,080 mm) bore (50 calibres)
- Shell: Fixed ammunition; 33 lb (15 kg) (projectile); 62.4–64.75 lb (28.30–29.37 kg) (complete round)
- Calibre: 4 in (102 mm)
- Elevation: -15° to +20°
- Traverse: -150° to 150°
- Rate of fire: 8-9 rounds per minute
- Muzzle velocity: Mark 7: 2,500 ft/s (760 m/s); Mark 8: 2,800 ft/s (850 m/s); Mark 9 and 10: 2,900 ft/s (880 m/s)
- Effective firing range: Mark 7: 9,000 yd (8,200 m) at 13° elevation
- Maximum firing range: Mark 9: 15,920 yd (14,560 m) at 20° elevation

The 4″/50-caliber gun (spoken "four-inch-fifty-caliber") was the standard low-angle, quick-firing gun for the United States, first appearing on the monitor Arkansas and then used on "Flush Deck" destroyers through World War I and the 1920s. It was also the standard deck gun on S-class submarines, and was used to rearm numerous submarines built with 3-inch (76 mm) guns early in World War II. United States naval gun terminology indicates the gun fired a projectile 4 inches (10 centimeters) in diameter, and the barrel was 50 calibers long. 4 inches x50 meant the barrel was 200 inches long, or 16 feet long .

== Design ==
The original 4-inch/50-caliber Mark 7 gun, M1898, serial nos. 213–254, 257–281, 316–338, was an entirely new high-power design built-up gun with a tube, jacket, hoop, locking ring and screw breech. Gun No. 213 had a liner. The gun was described as a 5-inch (127 mm) gun but with a 4-inch bore in the 1902 handbook, this indicated its higher power and also the fact the barrel was actually more the size of a 5-inch/40 caliber gun than a 4-inch gun. The ammunition was about 7 lb (3.2 kg) heavier than a 4-inch/40 caliber round. The Mod 1 was a Mod 0 that used a conical steel liner and the Mod 2 was either a Mod 0 or Mod 1 that was relined using a conical nickel-steel liner and a shoulder on the breech end.

Gun No. 353 was the prototype of the Mark 8 and was test fired on 22 September 1910. This gun had been ordered 16 June 1907 and delivered in November 1907. The simplified design of the Mark 8 had just a gun tube and jacket. The jacket extended all the way to the muzzle and ended in a muzzle bell. The production run was small with only 12 guns built, Nos. 353–364.

The Mark 9 was a design directly resulting from tests with gun No. 353. It was designed to be light in weight, and would go on to be the standard 4-inch gun used on destroyers and submarines during WW I. The gun would use an A tube, full-length jacket, a muzzle swell with a side swing Smith-Asbury breech mechanism and Welin breech block. The gun weighed about 2.725 short tons (2.472 t). Gun No. 365, the first Mark 9, was ordered from Midvale Steel on 18 October 1911. There were 390 Mark 9s built by four different manufacturers from 1911 until the US entered World War I in 1917. During the war another 1,885 guns were produced, with Root & VanDervoort, American Radiator Company and Poole Engineering joining the pre-war manufacturers. After the Armistice another 713 guns were produced, with orders for 3538 guns cancelled. It was decided after World War I that all destroyers would carry the 4-inch/50-caliber Mark 9 Mod 5 gun; the refits were completed in autumn 1921.

The Mark 10, gun No. 365-A, was ordered in 1915 but does not appear to have been completed until after WW I. The initial drawings were for a 4-inch/50-caliber anti-aircraft gun dated January and February 1915. It was designed with a vertically sliding breech block on a built-up gun with a tube, jacket, chase hoop and locking ring, all constructed of nickel steel, but it does not appear that the Mark 10 was put into service.

The gun was rapid firing (US term) or quick firing (British term). Fixed ammunition (case and projectile handled as a single assembled unit) with a 14.5-pound (6.6 kg) charge of smokeless powder gave a 33-pound (15 kg) projectile a velocity of 2,900 ft/s (880 m/s). Range was 9 mi (14 km) at the maximum elevation of 20 degrees. Useful life expectancy was 400–500 effective full charges (EFC) for a non-chrome plated barrel, while a chrome plated barrel was listed at 600 rounds.

Increasing awareness of the need for improved anti-aircraft protection resulted in the mounting of dual purpose guns on destroyers beginning in the 1930s. The dual-purpose 5-inch/38 caliber gun became standard for United States destroyers constructed from the 1930s through World War II. United States destroyers built with 4-inch/50-caliber low-angle guns were mostly rearmed with dual-purpose 3-inch/50 caliber guns during the war. The 4-inch/50-caliber guns removed from destroyers were mounted on Defensively Equipped Merchant Ships of the British Merchant Navy and United States Merchant Marine like SS Stephen Hopkins. As S-boats were transferred from combat patrols to training duties from mid-1942 through 1943, their 4-inch guns were removed and used to re-equip front-line submarines built with 3-inch/50-caliber guns.

== Manufacturer list Mark 9 gun ==
Manufacturer	Date ordered	Gun Nos.	Total built	Notes
Midvale Steel	18 October 1911	365–389	25	
Bethlehem Steel	7 November 1911	390–414	25	
British and American Mfg. Co.	4 February 1913	415–444	30	Mod 4 No. 432 on
Watervliet Arsenal	19 April 1913	445–478	34	Mod 4
British and American Mfg. Co.	28 November 1914	479–508	30	Mod 2, Mod 5 No. 502 on
Watervliet Arsenal	8 June 1915	509–538	30	Mod 2, Mod 5 No. 516 on
Bethlehem Steel	31 October 1916	539–605	67	Mod 5
British and American Mfg. Co.	18 November 1916	606–705	100	Mod 5
Watervliet Arsenal	17 October 1916	706–755	50	Mod 5
Bethlehem Steel	4 April 1917	756–855	100	Mod 5
Root & VanDervoort	25 May 1917	876–1875	1000	Nos. 856-875 were not assigned
American Radiator Corp.	7 June 1917	1876–2380	505	Nos. 2381-2875 were not assigned
Poole Engineering	29 August 1917	2876–2994	119	Nos. 2995-3375 were not assigned
American and British Co.	24 September 1917	3376–3506	131	Nos. 3507-3575 were not assigned
Watervliet Arsenal	11 July 1918	3576–3605	30	

The unassigned numbers mostly corresponded to gun orders that were cancelled with the signing of the Armistice.

== US Navy service ==
The 4″/50-caliber gun was mounted on:

- Arkansas-class monitors (Mark 7)
- Cassin-class destroyers
- Aylwin-class destroyers
- O'Brien-class destroyers
- Tucker-class destroyers
- Sampson-class destroyers
- Caldwell-class destroyers
- Wickes-class destroyers
- Clemson-class destroyers
- United States S-class submarines
- The first seven Balao-class submarines
- USS Dolphin
- Numerous rearmed submarines including USS Salmon, USS Seadragon, USS Gato, USS Silversides and USS Robalo
- Eagle-class patrol craft
- Some minesweepers - Q-ships like USS Eagle
- Some minelayers like USS Miantonomah
- Some patrol gunboats like USS Sacramento, Asheville-class gunboat, USS Plymouth
- armed yachts,

== United States Merchant Marine ==
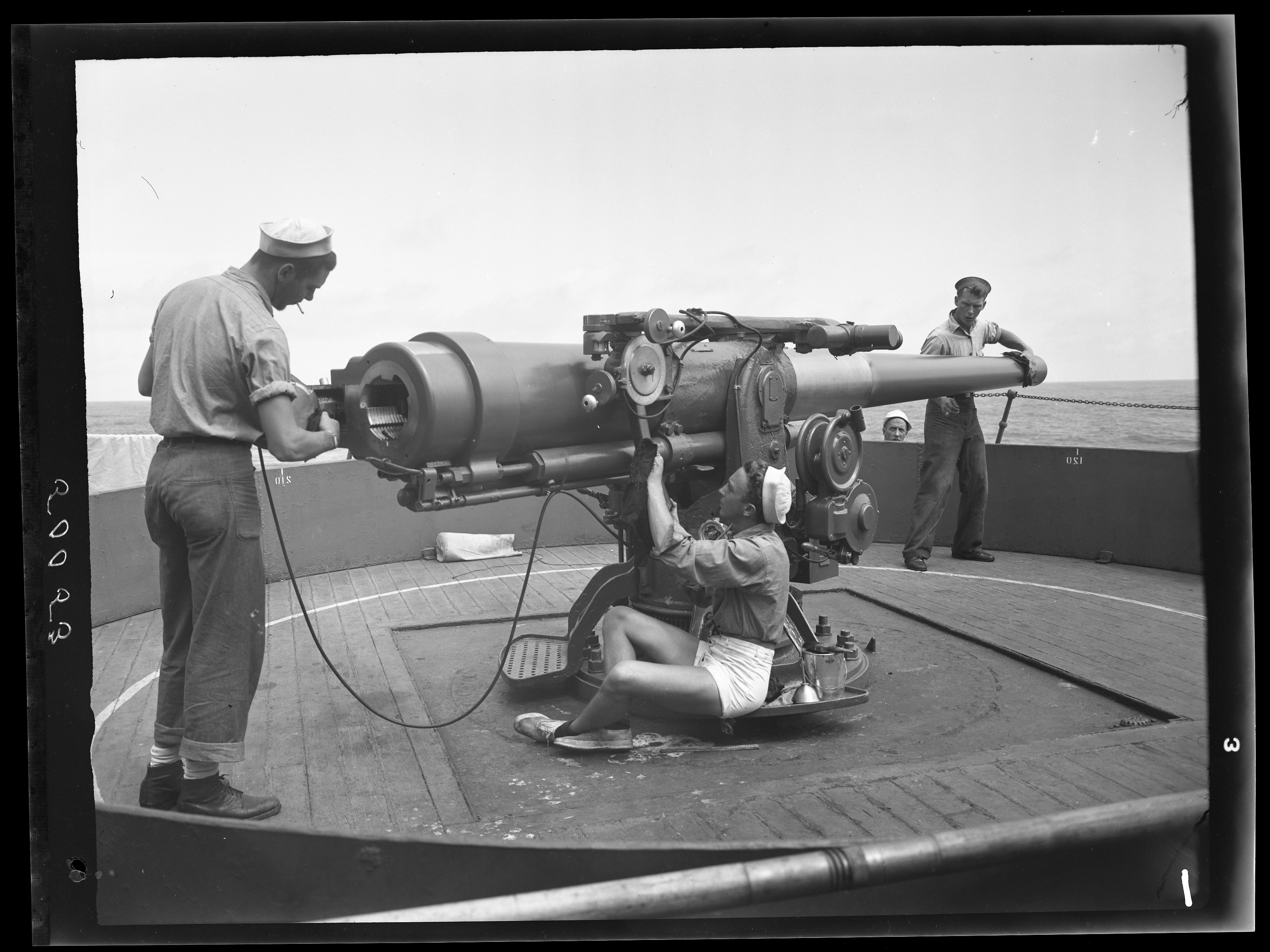
4-inch/50-caliber gun on merchant ship SS Sommelsdijk

- Most Liberty ships
- World War I underway replenishment oilers like USS Maumee
- Some World War II oilers like USS Big Horn, USS Victoria and USS Pasig

== Coast defense use ==
Four two-gun batteries of 4″/50-caliber ex-Navy guns were emplaced on the North Shore of Oahu in 1942. They seem to have been withdrawn in 1943 as other defenses were constructed. It is not clear who operated these guns; likely possibilities include the United States Army Coast Artillery Corps, Marine defense battalions, or naval personnel. The batteries were at Kaena, Kalihi (Mokuoeo Island), Battery Dillingham at Mokuleia, and Kaneohe Bay.

== UK service ==
Many Mark 9 guns were supplied to the United Kingdom during World War II as part of Lend-lease, both individually and on naval and merchant ships. Caldwell, Wickes, and Clemson-class destroyers transferred under the Destroyers for Bases Agreement became British and Canadian Town-class destroyers.

== See also ==
- List of naval guns
- Deck gun

=== Weapons of comparable role, performance and era ===
- QF 4-inch naval gun Mk IV: British equivalent
- 10.5 cm SK L/45 naval gun: German equivalent
