= USS Helena (PG-9) =

Gunboat of the United States Navy

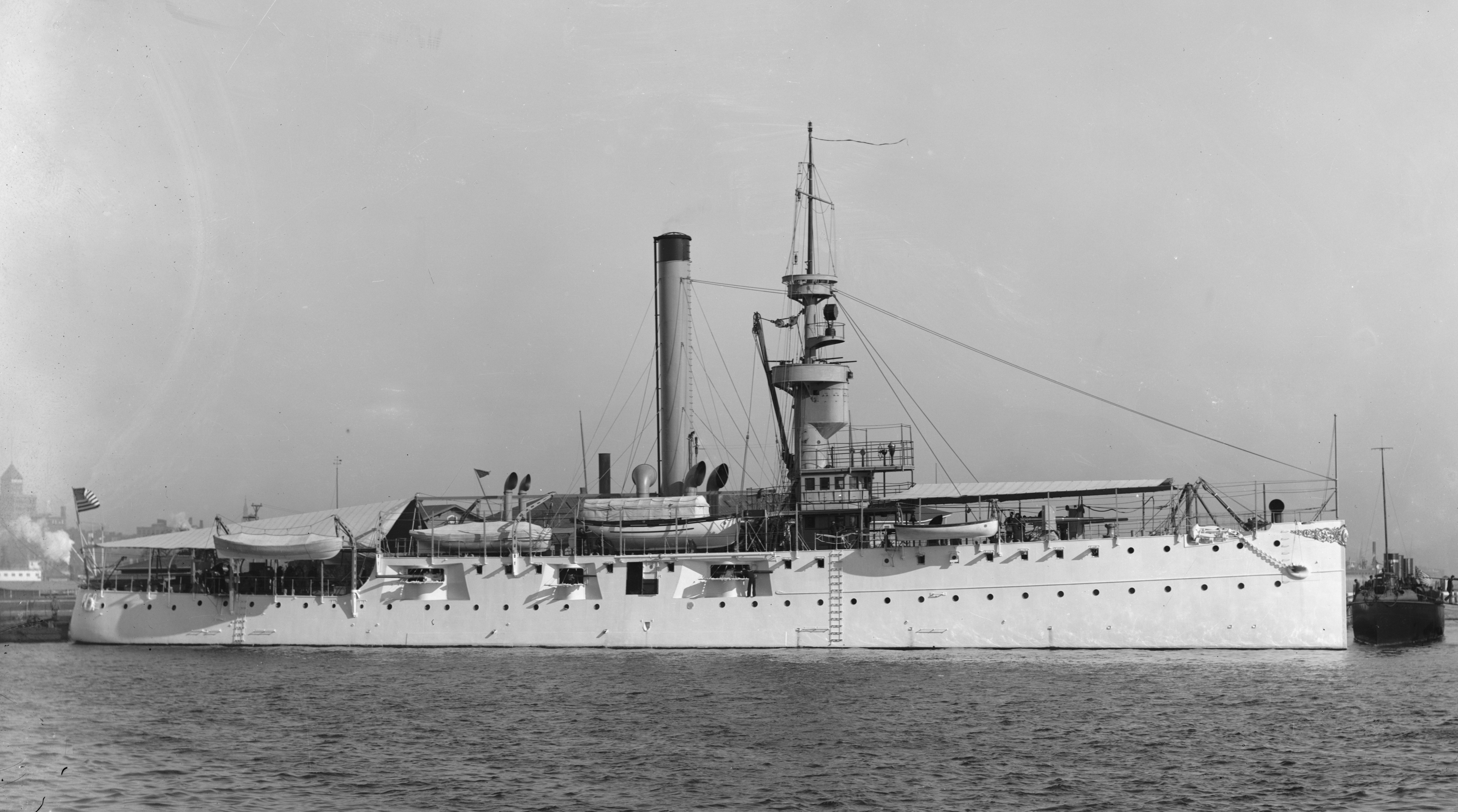
- USS Helena (PG-9) at anchor

History

United States
- Name: Helena
- Namesake: Helena, Montana
- Builder: Newport News Shipbuilding Co., Newport News, Virginia
- Laid down: 10 October 1894
- Launched: 30 January 1896
- Commissioned: 8 July 1897
- Decommissioned: 27 May 1932
- Stricken: 27 May 1932
- Fate: Sold for scrap, 7 July 1934

General characteristics
- Type: Wilmington-class gunboat
- Displacement: 1,390 long tons (1,410 t)
- Length: 250 ft 9 in (76.43 m)
- Beam: 40 ft 11 in (12.47 m)
- Draft: 9 ft (2.7 m)
- Propulsion: 2 × vertical triple expansion reciprocating engines; 2 × screws
- Speed: 13 kn (24 km/h; 15 mph)
- Range: 2,200 nmi (4,074 km; 2,532 mi) at 10 kn (19 km/h; 12 mph)
- Complement: 175
- Armament: 4 × 4 in (100 mm)/40 cal guns; 4 × 11–pounder guns; 1 × 3 in (76 mm) gun; 4 × 3-pounder guns

Service record
- Operations: Spanish–American War; Philippine–American War

USS Helena (PG-9) was a Wilmington-class gunboat of the United States Navy. She participated in the Spanish–American War, and served in the Far East for many years. The (PG-9) was the first of five Navy vessels named after the capital city of Montana.

The gunboat was launched by the Newport News Shipbuilding Co., Newport News, Virginia, on 30 January 1896. And she was sponsored by Agnes Belle Steele, daughter of the mayor of the city of Helena; commissioned at the New York Navy Yard on 8 July 1897, with Commander William T. Swinburne in command.

In the Proceedings of the United States Naval Institute for that year, it was written:

She is designed to meet the requirements of roomy and well-ventilated quarters, so as to provide for refugees, as in the case of missionaries, and to enable her to carry a large landing party. She has berthing capacity for many men besides her crew, and carries ships' boats of an unusual size, her steam cutter and sailing launch being each 33 feet long, or as large as those supplied to the heaviest battleships.

== Service history ==
=== Spanish–American War ===
Helena's first assignment was with the North Atlantic Fleet, cruising primarily in home waters. During the Spanish–American War, she stood by in the Cuban waters, where she saw action several times. On 2–3 July 1898, she exchanged fire with enemy batteries at Fort Tunas. On 18 July, she was part of the squadron that closed the port of Manzanillo, sinking or destroying ten vessels there during the Third Battle of Manzanillo.

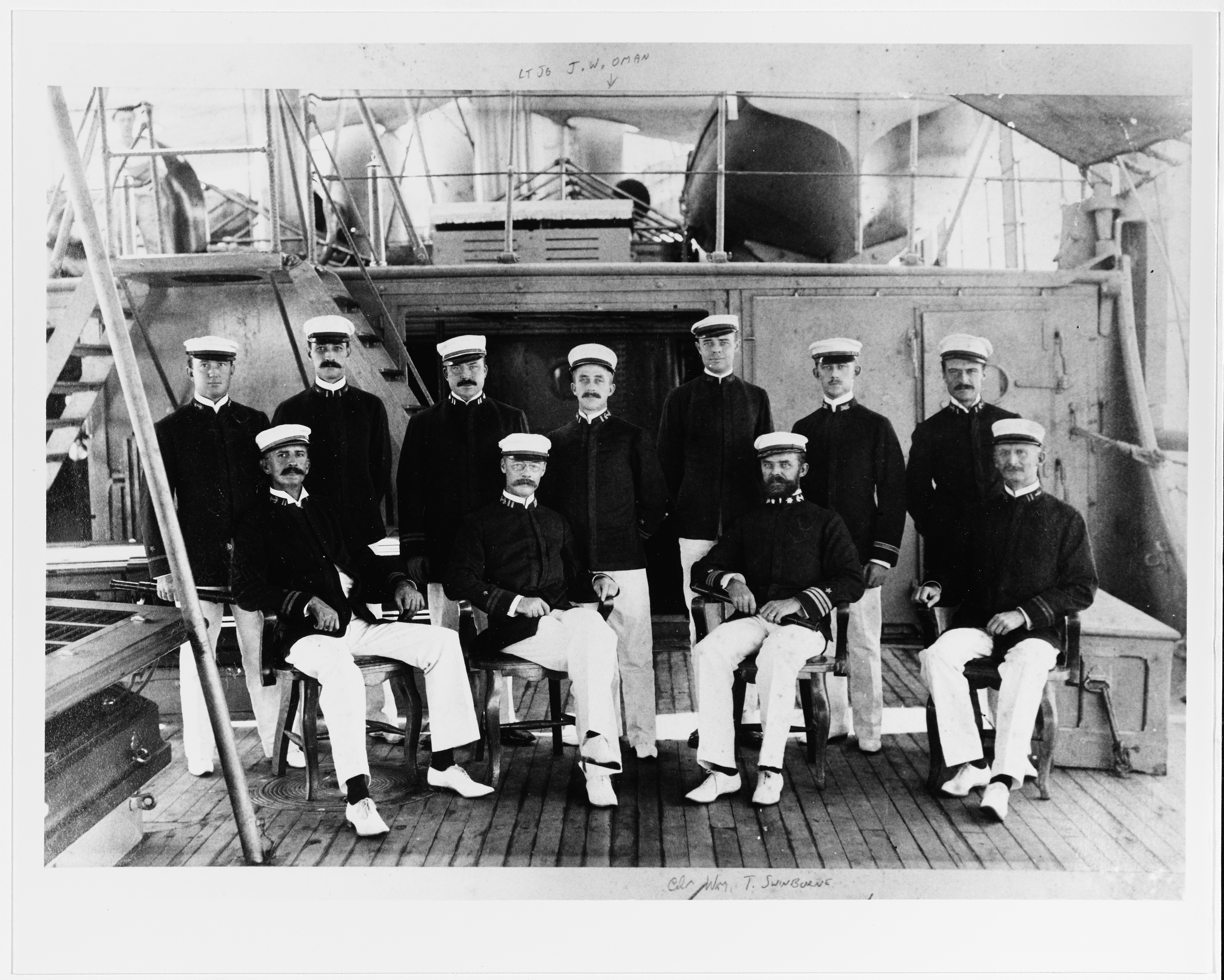
Officers in 1898

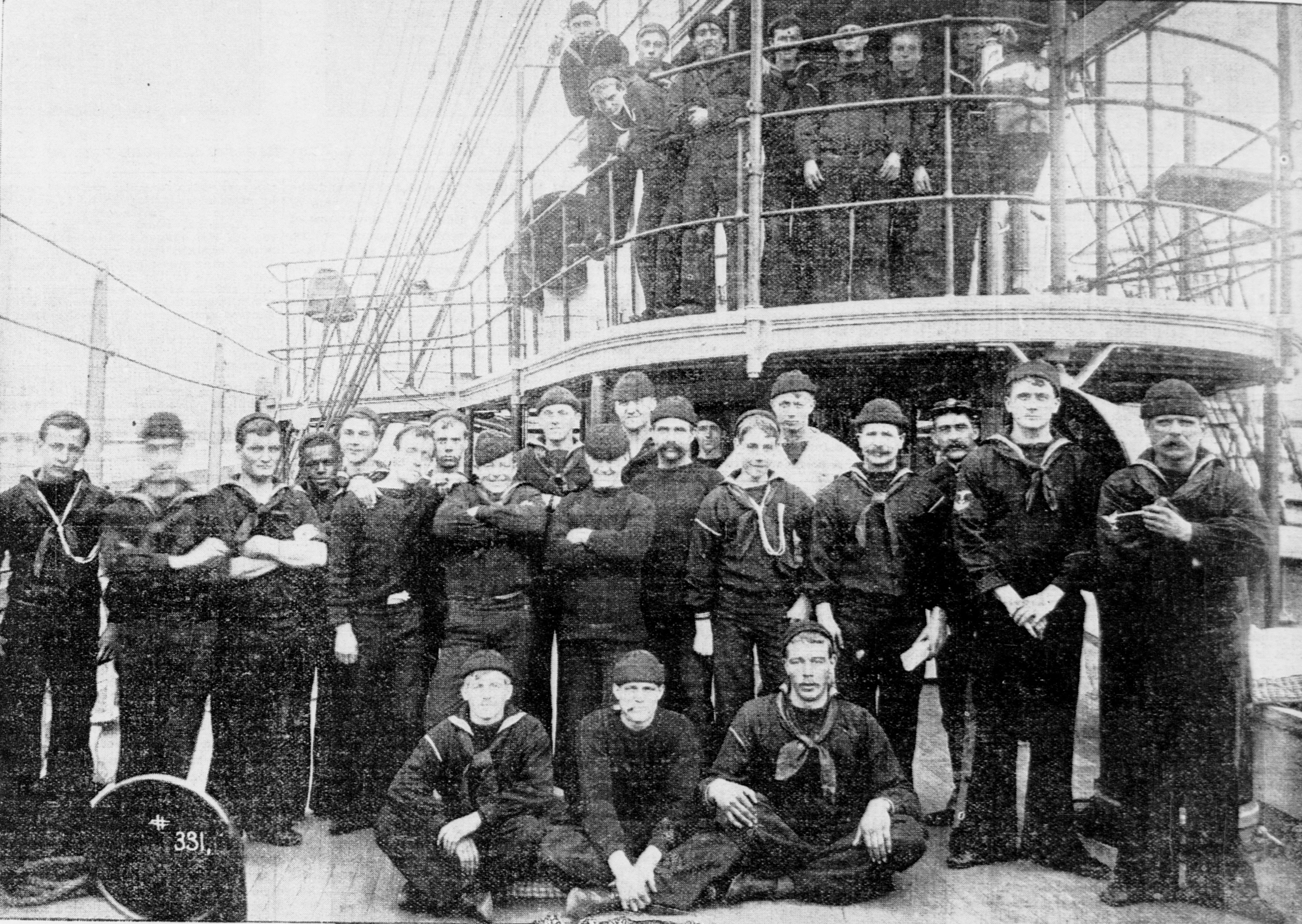
The crew in 1900.

=== Philippine-American War ===
The great problem facing the United States at the close of the Spanish–American War was the Philippine–American War. To aid in suppressing this rebellion, Helena sailed from Boston on 3 November 1898, bound for duty on the Asiatic Squadron, via the Suez Canal, arriving at the Philippines on 10 February 1899. On 21 May, she was present at the evacuation of Jolo by the Spanish, and the landing of the American troops to replace them. During June, she stood by with other vessels in Manila Bay to support the Army during its offensive south of Manila into the Cavite Province. One of her landing parties brought troops ashore in an assault that carried the strong defenses along the Zapote River on 13 June. On 7 November, Helena bombarded San Fabian in Lingayen Gulf, and covered the landing of 2,500 troops there, on the same beaches that would again be stormed by US troops 45 years later.

=== Post-war ===
Helena remained in the Far East for the rest of her naval service, engaged in protecting American lives and interests. She served in the Chinese waters from October 1900 – December 1902, then returned to the Philippines until March 1903, when she sailed back to the China coast. In December 1904, she moored once more at Cavite in the Philippines, where she was placed out of commission on 19 April 1905.

Helena was recommissioned on 16 July 1906, and cruised on the Asiatic Station until June 1907. From that time on, with intervals for overhaul, Helena served both with the South China patrol and the Yangtze River Patrol. She was placed in reduced commission on 29 June 1929, but continued to serve on the South China Patrol until 27 May 1932, when she was decommissioned and struck from the Naval Vessel Register. The gunboat was sold on 7 July 1934.

== Awards ==
- Sampson Medal
- Spanish Campaign Medal
- Philippine Campaign Medal
- Victory Medal
- Yangtze Service Medal
