= 4-inch/40-caliber gun =

Naval gun and coastal artillery

4″/40 caliber Marks 1, 2, 3, 4, 5, and 6
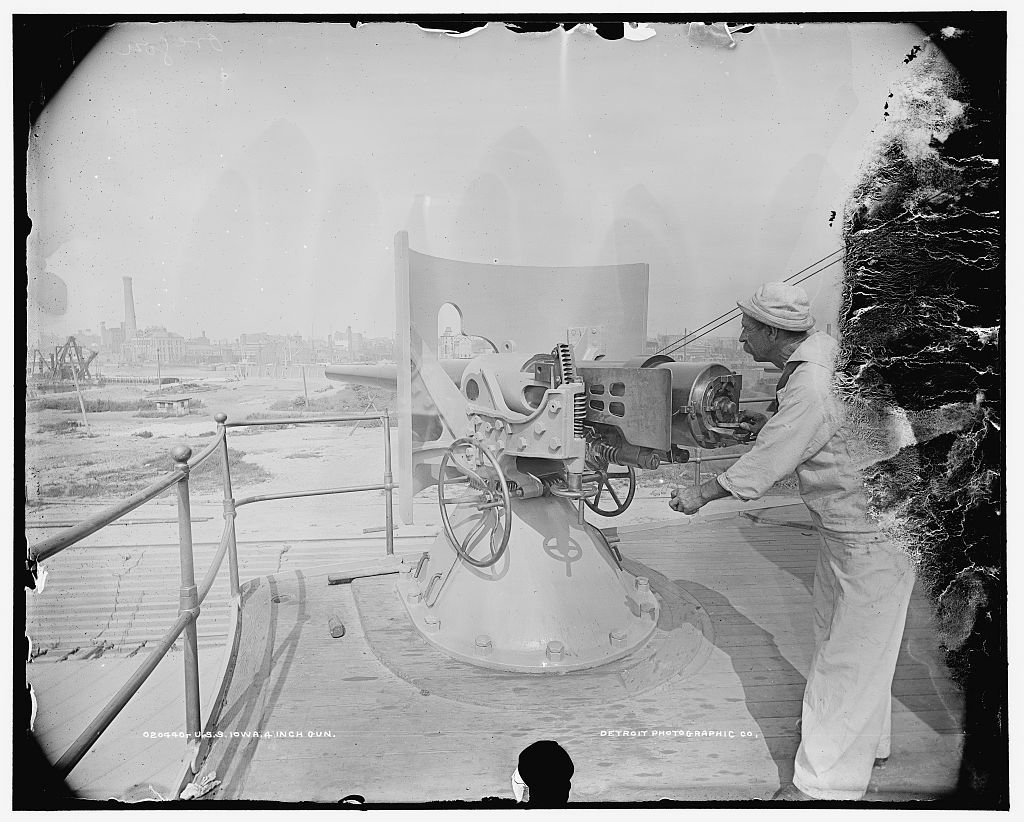
- Photograph of USS Iowa, 4-inch gun and gunner.
- Type: Naval gun; Coastal artillery
- Place of origin: United States

Service history
- In service: 1897—1945
- Used by: United States Navy
- Wars: Spanish–American War; Philippine–American War; Boxer Rebellion; World War I; Siberian Intervention; World War II

Production history
- Designer: Bureau of Ordnance
- Manufacturer: Naval Gun Factory; American Ordnance Company; Bethlehem Steel
- No. built: Mark 1: 4 (Nos. 1–3, 6); Mark 2: 2 (Nos. 4–5); Mark 3: 69 (Nos. 7–69, 71, 73, 74, 82, 87); Mark 4: 45 (Nos. 108–117, 180–209, 255; Mark 5: 23 (Nos. 70, 72, 75–81, 83, 85, 86, 88–98); Mark 6: 119 (Nos. 99–107, 118–179, 210–212, 256, 283–312, 339–352)
- Variants: Marks 1 – 6

Specifications
- Mass: Mark 1: 3,388 lb (1,537 kg) (without breech); Mark 2: 3,398 lb (1,541 kg) (without breech); Mark 4: 3,160 lb (1,430 kg) (with breech); Mark 5: 3,100 lb (1,400 kg) (with breech); Mark 6: 3,529 lb (1,601 kg) (with breech)
- Length: Marks 1–3, 6: 164 in (4.2 m); Marks 4–5: 166.25 in (4.22 m)
- Barrel length: Marks 1 and 3: 160 in (4.1 m) bore (40 calibers); Marks 2: 157.5 in (4.00 m) bore (39 calibers); Marks 4–6: 164 in (4.2 m) bore (41 calibers)
- Shell: 33 lb (15 kg) armor-piercing
- Caliber: 4 in (102 mm)
- Elevation: -15° to +20°
- Traverse: −150° to +150°
- Rate of fire: 8 – 9 round per minute
- Muzzle velocity: 2,000 ft/s (610 m/s)
- Effective firing range: 11,500 yd (10,500 m) at 31.2° elevation

The 4″/40 caliber gun (spoken "four-inch-forty-caliber") was used for the secondary batteries on the United States Navy's battleship Iowa, Columbia-class protected cruisers, and the armored cruiser New York, and was the primary batteries on the gunboats Nashville, Wilmington, and Helena.

== Design ==
The 4-inch (102 mm) Mark 1 Mod 0 was a built-up gun constructed in a length of 40 caliber. The Mod 0 had a tube, jacket, and two hoops, hooped to 50 in (1,300 mm) from the muzzle, all of gun steel. All Mark 1s were fitted with slotted-screw breeches but were later refitted with Fletcher rapid-fire breeches. The Mark 1 was described in the 1902 handbook as the M1889. The Mod 1 was of similar construction as the Mark 1 Mod 0 but had a screw-box liner and chamber liner so that it could use fixed ammunition instead of bag like the Mod 0 with all Mark 1s having their chambers bored out to 5.7 in (140 mm) diameter with a liner inserted so they could all use fixed ammunition in 1900. All Mark 1, 2, and 3 guns, were mounted on rapid-fire recoil mounts.

The Mark 2 only consisted of two guns, Nos. 4 and 5. They were of similar construction as the Mark 1 but with the addition of a balancing hoop and the bore length being reduced to 157.5 in (4,000 mm) (39 caliber). They use a Driggs-Schroeder breech and were also an M1889 gun. Gun No. 4, the first Mark 2, was completed in September 1890.

The Mark 3 Mod 0, M1890, would be the production version of the 4-inch/40 caliber bag gun with a total of 69 built in five Mods. The Mod 1 added a screw-box liner and chamber liner allowing it to use fixed ammunition along with only one hoop and a locking hoop and was hooped to within 52.5 in (1,330 mm) of the muzzle. Mod 2 was slightly heavier than the Mark 1 Mod 0 by 10 lb (4.5 kg) even with a 2.5 in (64 mm) shorter length, 39 caliber. The Mod 2 used fixed ammunitions with 500 psi (3,400 kPa) higher chamber pressure and balancing hoop. Mod 3s mounting threads on the barrel were in a different location and dimension from the Mod 2, other than this the two Mods were very similar. Mod 4 was a Mod 0 or 1 with a modified conical nickel-steel liner with a smaller chamber and the Mod 5 was a Mod 2 or 3 with the same liner as the Mod 4.

The Mark 4, also known as the M1895 gun, was of an entirely new design intended to arm auxiliaries. It consisted of a tube, jacket, hoop, locking hoop, and faceplate with the Mod 1 being a Mod 0 but with a conical nickel-steel liner. The Mark 5 was almost the same as the Mark 4 just without the faceplate, with the Mod 1 also being a Mod 0 with a conical nickel-steel liner.

Mark 6, M1895–1898, were to be the last of the 40 caliber 4-inch guns. The Mark 6 Mod 0 only differed from the Mark 5 by its breech mechanism. Some of the Mark 6s had a muzzle bell and like the Mark 4s and 5s before, the Mod 1 was a Mod 0 with a conical nickel-steel liner. Contracts were given to American Ordnance Company for 21 guns, Nos. 145–164, and 212, and Bethlehem Steel for 20 guns, Nos. 163–179, 210, and 211. Obviously, guns No. 163 and 164 are listed for both companies, but it is not known at this time where the error lies.

== Naval mounts ==
The navy had five different mounts, Marks 2–4, 7 and 9, for the 4-inch/40. They were all single gun mounts with manual elevation and training. The Mark 2 and 3 where Central Pivot mounts with the Mark 3 being different from the Mark 2 in not having a directing bar, the training was by handwheel, the sights were located on the slide and it was non-recoiling, many of the Mark 2 mounts were converted to the Mark 3. The Mark 4, 7, and 9 were all Pedestal mountings. The cruiser that these were mounted on had continuous chain ammunition hoists that were electrically powered.

== Naval service ==
- Iowa (6 guns)
- Columbia-class cruiser (8 guns each)
- New York (12 guns)
- Nashville (8 guns)
- Wilmington (8 guns)
- Helena (8 guns)

== Army coast artillery service ==
The United States Army Coast Artillery Corps adopted this weapon in very limited quantities. Four guns were acquired, with two each emplaced in Battery Plunkett at Fort Warren in the Harbor Defenses of Boston and in Battery White at Fort Washington in Maryland near Washington, D.C. The Army guns were designated 4-inch Navy gun M1896 and were designed by Driggs-Schroeder, on mounts built by the William Cramp & Sons shipyard of Philadelphia. It is unclear which Navy mark or model they corresponded to. Battery Plunkett was active 1899-1920, while Battery White was active 1899-1921. The guns were removed and Battery White's scrapped as part of general removal from service of weapons deployed in limited quantities in the 1920s. Battery Plunkett's guns were retained for display at Fort Warren through early World War II, but probably were donated to a scrap drive in that war.

== Bibliography ==
- "Battery Plunkett". FortWiki.com. 18 March 2015.
- "Battery White". FortWiki.com. 11 May 2015.
- Berhow, Mark A., ed. (2015). American Seacoast Defenses, A Reference Guide (Third ed.). McLean, Virginia: CDSG Press. ISBN 978-0-9748167-3-9.
- Friedman, Norman (2011). Naval Weapons of World War One. Seaforth Publishing. pp. 187–188. ISBN 978-1-84832-100-7.
- "United States of America 4″/40 (10.2 cm) Marks 1, 3, 4, 5 and 6 4″/39 (10.2 cm) Mark 2". Navweaps. 12 February 2012.
