= List of ship commissionings in 1906 =

This is a chronological list of ship commissionings occurring in 1906.

Date	Operator	Ship	Flag	Class and type	Pennant	Other notes
19 February	United States Navy	Rhode Island		Virginia-class battleship	BB-17	
5 April	Imperial German Navy	Roon		Roon-class cruiser		
20 April	Imperial German Navy	Leipzig		Bremen-class cruiser		
7 May	United States Navy	Virginia		Virginia-class battleship	BB-13	
11 May	United States Navy	New Jersey		Virginia-class battleship	BB-16	
18 May	Imperial German Navy	Lothringen		Braunschweig-class battleship		
2 June	United States Navy	Louisiana		Connecticut-class battleship	BB-19	
3 August	Imperial German Navy	Deutschland		Deutschland-class battleship		
8 September	Royal Navy	Britannia		King Edward VII-class battleship		
27 September	United States Navy	Georgia		Virginia-class battleship	BB-15	
29 September	United States Navy	Connecticut		Connecticut-class battleship	BB-18	
6 November	Royal Navy	Africa		King Edward VII-class battleship		
2 December	Royal Navy	Dreadnought		Dreadnought-class battleship		
21 December	Royal Netherlands Navy	O 1		O 1-class submarine	O 1	
