= SS Georgia =

SS Georgia is the name of the following ships:

- SS Georgia (1890)
- SS Georgia (1908)

== See also ==
- Georgia (disambiguation)
- CSS Georgia
- USS Georgia
- SS Georgiana
- SS Georgian
