= USS Georgia =

Two ships of the United States Navy have been named USS Georgia in honor of the fourth state.

- USS Georgia (BB-15), a Virginia-class battleship, provided training and convoy escort services during World War I, and became a transport to bring troops home after the war ended
- USS Georgia (SSGN-729), the fourth Ohio-class submarine, no longer serves as a ballistic missile submarine (SSBN), but has been converted into a guided missile submarine (SSGN).

== See also ==
- CSS Georgia
- USS State of Georgia, an American Civil War gunboat steamer of the Union Navy
- Georgia (disambiguation)
