= Georgian =

Georgian may refer to:

== Common meanings ==
- Anything related to, or originating from Georgia (country)
  - Georgians, an indigenous Caucasian ethnic group
  - Georgian language, a Kartvelian language spoken by Georgians
  - Georgian scripts, three scripts used to write the language
  - Georgian (Unicode block), a Unicode block containing the Mkhedruli and Asomtavruli scripts
  - Georgian cuisine, cooking styles and dishes with origins in the nation of Georgia and prepared by Georgian people around the world
- Someone from Georgia (U.S. state)
- Georgian era, a period of British history (1714–1837)
  - Georgian architecture, the set of architectural styles current between 1714 and 1837

== Airlines ==
- Georgian Airways, an airline based in Tbilisi, Georgia
- Georgian International Airlines, an airline based in Tbilisi, Georgia
- Air Georgian, an airline based in Ontario, Canada
- Sky Georgia, an airline based in Tbilisi, Georgia

== Arts and entertainment ==
- The Georgians (Frank Guarente), an American jazz and dance band of the 1920s
- The Georgians (Nat Gonella), a British jazz band of the 1930s
- Georgian poets, a group of early 20th century English poets
- Georgian Theatre Royal, a theatre and playhouse in Richmond, North Yorkshire, UK

== People ==
- Georgian Honciu (born 1989), Romanian footballer
- Georgian Mișu (born 2001 as Ionel Georgian Mișu), Romanian footballer
- Georgian Păun (born 1985), Romanian footballer
- Georgian Popescu (born 1984), Romanian amateur boxer
- Georgian Tobă (born 1989), Romanian footballer

== Places ==
- Georgian Bay, Lake Huron, Ontario, Canada
- Georgian Cliff, Alexander Island, Antarctica

== Schools ==
- Georgian College, Barrie, Ontario, Canada
- Georgian International Academy, a research and academic institution in Tbilisi, Georgia
- Georgian Technical University, a technical university in Tbilisi, Georgia

== Other uses ==
- The Atlanta Georgian, a defunct American newspaper
- Augusta Georgians, an American minor league baseball team from 1920 to 1921
- Georgian Mall, a mall in Barrie, Ontario, Canada
- Georgian (train), a Chicago-to-Atlanta passenger train route

== See also ==
- Georgia (disambiguation)
