= South Georgia (disambiguation) =

South Georgia is a British island in the southern Atlantic Ocean.

South Georgia may also refer to:

- South Georgia and the South Sandwich Islands, a British overseas territory centered around South Georgia
- South Georgia State College, in the cities of Douglas and Waycross in the U.S. state of Georgia
- The southern part of Georgia (country)
- The southern (coastal plain) half of the U.S. state of Georgia
  - South Georgia (region), the southern region of Georgia, United States
  - Southeast Georgia, the southeastern region of Georgia, United States
  - Southwest Georgia, the southwestern region of Georgia, United States

== See also ==
- Georgia (disambiguation)
