= West Georgia =

West Georgia may refer to:

- University of West Georgia, a public university in Carrollton, Georgia, U.S.
  - West Georgia Wolves, athletic teams of the University of West Georgia
- West Georgia Technical College, a community college in Waco, Georgia, U.S.
- West Georgia Council, a former scouting council
- West Georgia Regional Library, a library system in northwest Georgia, U.S.
- West Georgia Regional Airport, a public use airport near Carrollton, Georgia, U.S.
- The western part of the country of Georgia
- West Georgia, a region in the U.S. state of Georgia
- West Central Georgia, a region in the U.S. state of Georgia
- Northwest Georgia, a region in the U.S. state of Georgia
- Southwest Georgia, a region in the U.S. state of Georgia
- West Georgia Street, in Vancouver, British Columbia, Canada

== See also ==
- Eastern Georgia (disambiguation)
- Georgia (disambiguation)
