= Misu (disambiguation) =

Misu is a Korean beverage.

Misu may also refer to:

- Misu (sudare blind)
- Misu (Japanese architecture)
- MISU, Munich International Summer University, a summer academy organized by LMU Munich
- Mișu, a Romanian given name and surname
