= Eastern Georgia =

Eastern Georgia may refer to:

- Eastern Georgia (country), the eastern half of the Republic of Georgia
- East Georgia (region), a region in the U.S. state of Georgia
- East Central Georgia, a region in the U.S. state of Georgia
- Northeast Georgia, a region in the U.S. state of Georgia
- Southeast Georgia, a region in the U.S. state of Georgia

== See also ==
- Western Georgia (disambiguation)
- Georgia (disambiguation)
