= USS Nebraska (BB-14) =

Pre-dreadnought battleship of the United States Navy

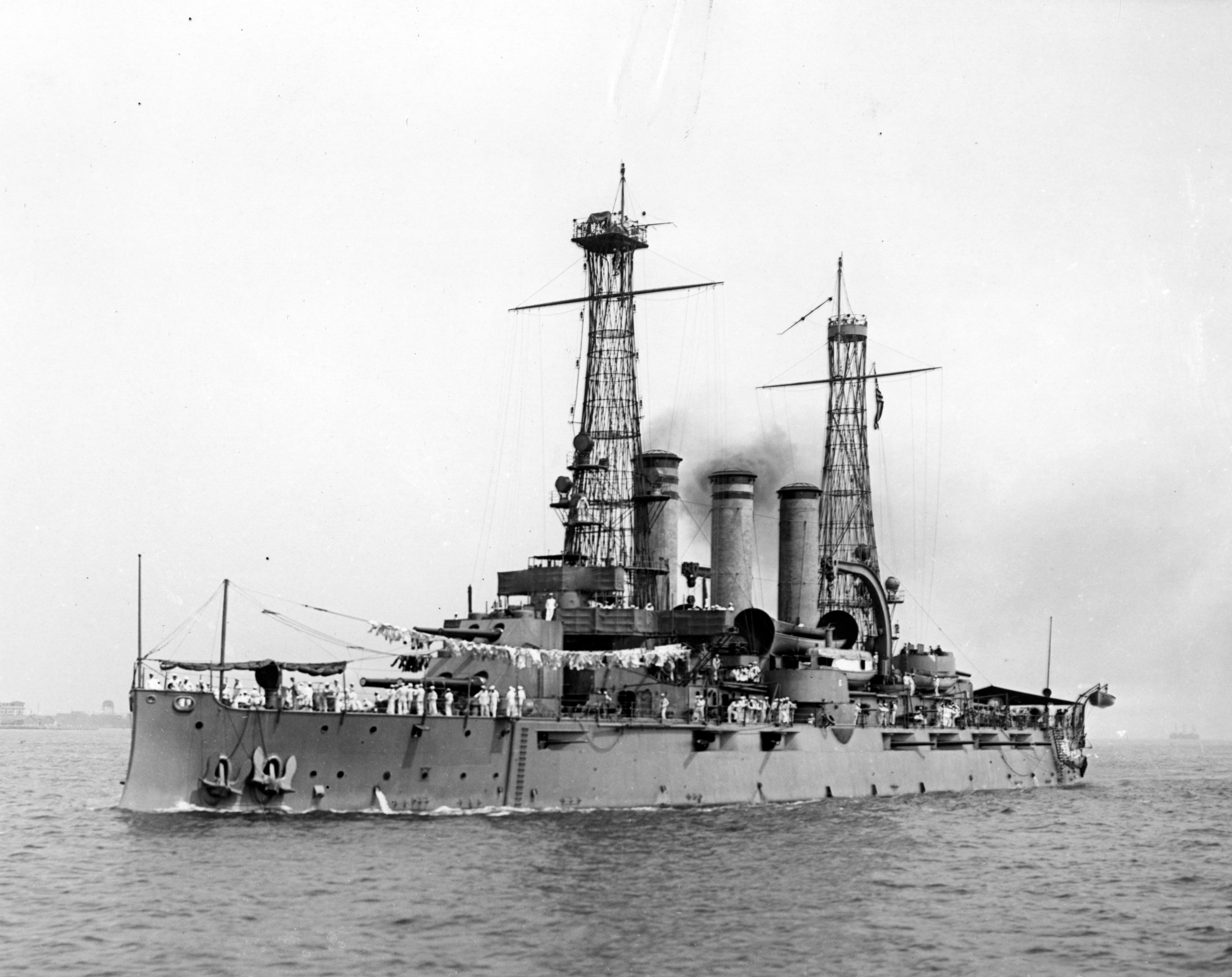
- Nebraska off of New York City in July 1910

History

United States
- Name: Nebraska
- Namesake: Nebraska
- Builder: Moran Brothers Shipbuilding
- Laid down: 4 July 1902
- Launched: 7 October 1904
- Commissioned: 1 July 1907
- Decommissioned: 2 July 1920
- Stricken: 12 July 1922
- Fate: Sold for scrap

General characteristics
- Class & type: Virginia-class battleship
- Displacement: Normal: 14,948 long tons (15,188 t); Full load: 16,094 long tons (16,352 t)
- Length: 441 ft 3 in (134 m)
- Beam: 76 ft 3 in (23 m)
- Draft: 23 ft 9 in (7 m)
- Installed power: 12 × Babcock & Wilcox boilers; 19,000 ihp (14,000 kW)
- Propulsion: 2 × triple-expansion steam engines; 2 × screw propellers
- Speed: 19 kn (35 km/h; 22 mph)
- Complement: 812
- Armament: 4 × 12 in (305 mm)/40 caliber guns; 8 × 8 in (203 mm)/45 cal guns; 12 × 6 in (152 mm)/50 cal guns; 12 × 3 in (76 mm)/50 cal guns; 12 × 3-pounder guns; 4 × 21 inch (533 mm) torpedo tubes
- Armor: Belt: 6–11 in (152–279 mm); Barbettes: 10 in (254 mm); Turrets: 12 in (305 mm); Conning tower: 9 in (229 mm)

USS Nebraska (hull number: BB-14) was a Virginia-class pre-dreadnought battleship of the United States Navy, the second of five members of the class, and the first ship to carry her name. She was built by the Moran Brothers shipyard in Seattle, Washington, with her keel-laying in July 1902 and her launching in October 1904. The completed ship was commissioned into the US Navy in July 1907. The ship was armed with an offensive battery of four 12-inch (305 mm) guns and eight 8-inch (203 mm) guns, and she was capable of a top speed of 19 knots (35 km/h; 22 mph).

Nebraska joined the Great White Fleet after it reached the west coast of the United States in 1908 and continued with it during its circumnavigation of the globe. From 1909 to 1914, the ship conducted normal training and ceremonial duties with the Atlantic Fleet. She was deployed twice to Mexico during the Mexican Revolution, in mid-1914 and mid-1916, before being decommissioned briefly in 1916. She was reactivated shortly before the United States entered World War I in April 1917, and was thereafter used as a training ship and later as a convoy escort. After the war, she transported American soldiers back from France, and in 1919 she was transferred to the Pacific Fleet, though she remained in service for less than a year, being decommissioned in July 1920. The 1922 Washington Naval Treaty mandated her disposal, which was effected in November 1923, when she was broken up for scrap.

== Design ==
Design work on the Virginia class began in 1899, after the United States' victory in the Spanish–American War, which had demonstrated the need for sea-going battleships suitable for operations abroad, finally resolving the debate between proponents of that type and those who favored low-freeboard types useful for coastal defense. The designers included a superposed arrangement of the main and some of the secondary guns, which proved to be a significant disappointment in service, as firing either set of guns interfered with the others, slowing the rate of fire.

Plan and profile of the Virginia class

Nebraska was 441 feet 3 inches (134.49 m) long overall and had a beam of 76 ft 3 in (23.24 m) and a draft of 23 ft 9 in (7.24 m). She displaced 14,948 long tons (15,188 t) as designed and up to 16,094 long tons (16,352 t) at full load. The ship was powered by two-shaft triple-expansion steam engines rated at 19,000 indicated horsepower (14,000 kW), with steam provided by twelve coal-fired Babcock & Wilcox boilers. The propulsion system generated a top speed of 19 knots (35 km/h; 22 mph). As built, she was fitted with heavy military masts, but these were quickly replaced by cage masts in 1909. She had a crew of 812 officers and enlisted men.

The ship was armed with a main battery of four 12 in (305 mm) /40 caliber Mark 4 (Note: /40 refers to the length of the gun in terms of calibers. A /40 gun is 40 times long as it is in bore diameter.) guns in two twin gun turrets on the centerline, one forward and aft. The secondary battery consisted of eight 8 in (203 mm) /45 caliber guns and twelve 6 in (152 mm) /50 caliber Mark 6 guns. The 8-inch guns were mounted in four twin turrets; two of these were superposed atop the main battery turrets, with the other two turrets abreast the forward funnel. The 6-inch guns were placed in casemates in the hull. For close-range defense against torpedo boats, she carried twelve 3-inch (76 mm)/50 caliber guns, mounted in casemates along the side of the hull, and twelve 3-pounder guns. As was standard for capital ships of the period, Nebraska carried four 21 inch (533 mm) torpedo tubes, submerged in her hull on the broadside.

Nebraska's main armored belt was 11 in (279 mm) thick over the magazines and the machinery spaces and 6 in (152 mm) elsewhere. The faces of the main battery gun turrets (and the secondary turrets on top of them) were 12-inch (305 mm) thick. Each turret rested on a supporting barbettes that had 10 in (254 mm) of armor plating. The conning tower had 9 in (229 mm) thick sides.

== Service history ==
=== Pre-World War I ===
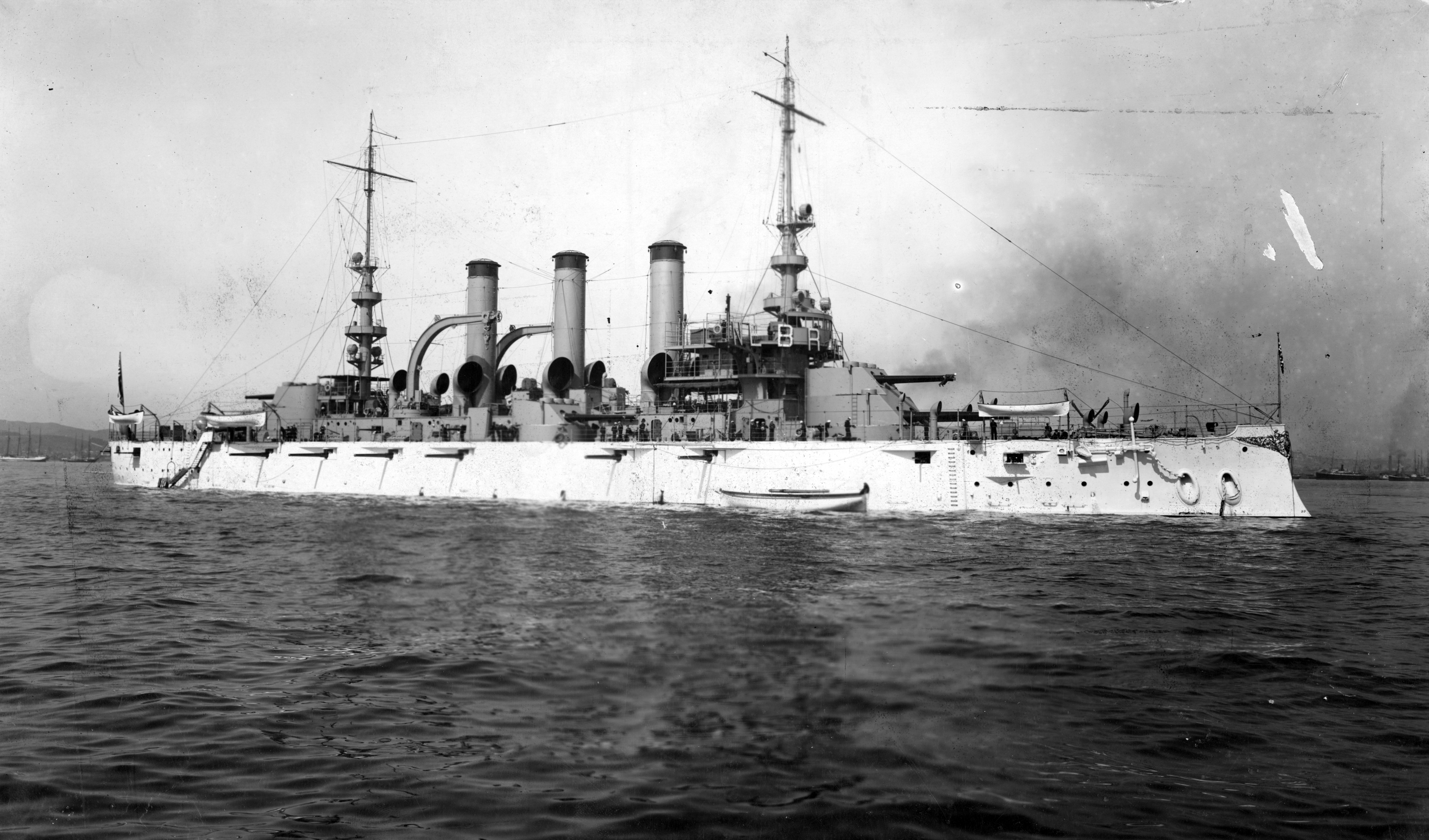
Nebraska in 1908, probably around the time she joined the Great White Fleet

The keel for Nebraska was laid down at the Moran Brother's Shipyard in Seattle, Washington on 4 July 1902. She was launched on 7 October 1904 and was commissioned into the fleet on 1 July 1907, the last member of the class to enter service. Her first commander was Captain Reginald F. Nicholson. After entering service, she conducted shakedown cruises and had minor alterations made. In May 1908, she steamed to San Francisco, arriving on the 6th. There, she joined the Great White Fleet, which had departed Hampton Roads, Virginia, the previous year on the first leg of its global cruise. Nebraska replaced the battleship USS Alabama (BB-8), and the fleet departed San Francisco on 7 July. The cruise of the Great White Fleet was conceived as a way to demonstrate American military power, particularly to Japan. Tensions had begun to rise between the United States and Japan after the latter's victory in the Russo-Japanese War in 1905, particularly over racist opposition to Japanese immigration to the United States. The press in both countries began to call for war, and Roosevelt hoped to use the demonstration of naval might to deter Japanese aggression.

The Great White Fleet then began its crossing of the Pacific, with a visit to Hawaii on the way. Stops in the South Pacific included Melbourne, Sydney, and Auckland. After leaving Australia, the fleet turned north for the Philippines, stopping in Manila, before continuing on to Japan where a welcoming ceremony was held in Yokohama. Three weeks of exercises followed in Subic Bay in the Philippines in November. The ships passed Singapore on 6 December and entered the Indian Ocean; they coaled in Colombo before proceeding to the Suez Canal and coaling again at Port Said, Egypt. The fleet called in several Mediterranean ports before stopping in Gibraltar, where an international fleet of British, Russian, French, and Dutch warships greeted the Americans. The ships then crossed the Atlantic to return to Hampton Roads on 22 February 1909, having traveled 46,729 nautical miles (86,542 km; 53,775 mi). There, they conducted a naval review for President Theodore Roosevelt.

After the conclusion of the ceremonies, Nebraska remained in service with the Atlantic Fleet. In late 1909 she took part in the Hudson–Fulton Celebration in New York. The celebration saw an international fleet of warships from Germany, Britain, France, Italy, and other countries join the Atlantic Fleet to commemorate Henry Hudson's discovery of the Hudson River. In 1912, Nebraska took part in a ceremony for the centennial anniversary of Louisiana's entrance into the United States. The ship was deployed to Mexico twice to protect American interests during the Mexican Revolution, the first from 1 May to 21 June 1914, and the second from 1 June to 13 October 1916. For these actions, the ship was awarded the Mexican Service Medal. The ship was briefly decommissioned in 1916, but returned to service on 3 April 1917.

=== World War I ===
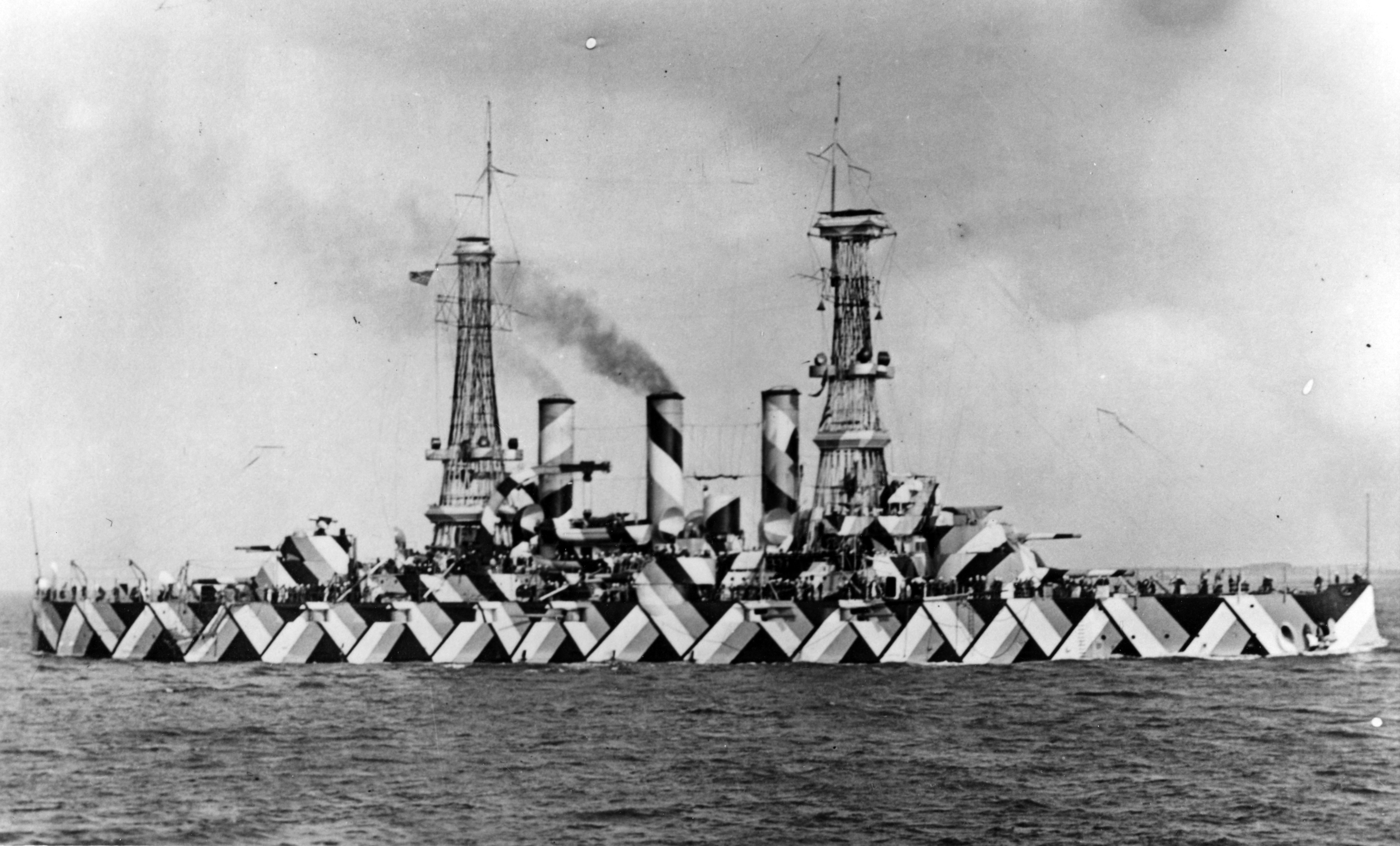
Nebraska painted with experimental camouflage c. 1918

Three days after Nebraska was recommissioned, the United States declared war on Germany over the latter's unrestricted submarine warfare campaign, thereby joining World War I. The ship was assigned to the 3rd Division, Battleship Force of the Atlantic Fleet, and on 13 April, she joined the rest of the fleet for battle training in the Chesapeake Bay. She remained on the eastern coast of the United States and was tasked with training guard crews for transport ships. On 15 April 1918, she entered the Norfolk Navy Yard for periodic maintenance. On 16 May, Nebraska embarked the remains of the recently deceased Uruguayan ambassador, Carlos DePena, at Hampton Roads. She departed that day with the armored cruiser Pittsburgh—the flagship of the Pacific Fleet—and arrived in Montevideo, Uruguay on 10 June. The commander of the Pacific Fleet came aboard Nebraska for the transfer ceremonies. The two ships left Montevideo on 15 June and reached Hampton Roads on 26 July.

Starting in September, Nebraska began to be employed as an escort for convoys to Europe. On the 17th, she departed New York with convoy HX 49, a group of eighteen ships; the rest of the escort included the destroyer Dent and the armed merchant cruiser (AMC) Rochester, and the British AMC HMS Arlanza. At a rendezvous point in the eastern Atlantic, she handed the convoy off to other escorts that would take the ships to France. Nebraska arrived back in Hampton Roads on 3 October. She escorted another two convoys before the war ended in November 1918. In December, she was equipped to carry American soldiers back from France. She made four such trips to Brest, France, and carried some 4,540 men back to the United States. The first trip began on 30 December; she reached Brest on 11 January 1919 and after embarking a contingent of soldiers, departed for Newport News, Virginia, where they arrived on 28 January. The fourth trip concluded on 21 June 1919, also in Newport News.

On 22 June 1919, Nebraska was transferred from the Cruiser and Transport Force to the Pacific Fleet. She departed the east coast shortly thereafter, bound for the Pacific. On 2 July 1920, the ship was decommissioned, and on the 15th she was reclassified as BB-14. She remained out of service until 12 July 1922 when she was stricken from the naval register in accordance with the Washington Naval Treaty signed earlier that year. The terms of the treaty mandated significant reductions in naval strength, and on 9 November 1923, Nebraska was declared to have been rendered unfit for further warlike service in accordance with the treaty. She was then sold to ship breakers.
