= USS Rhode Island (BB-17) =

Pre-dreadnought battleship of the United States Navy

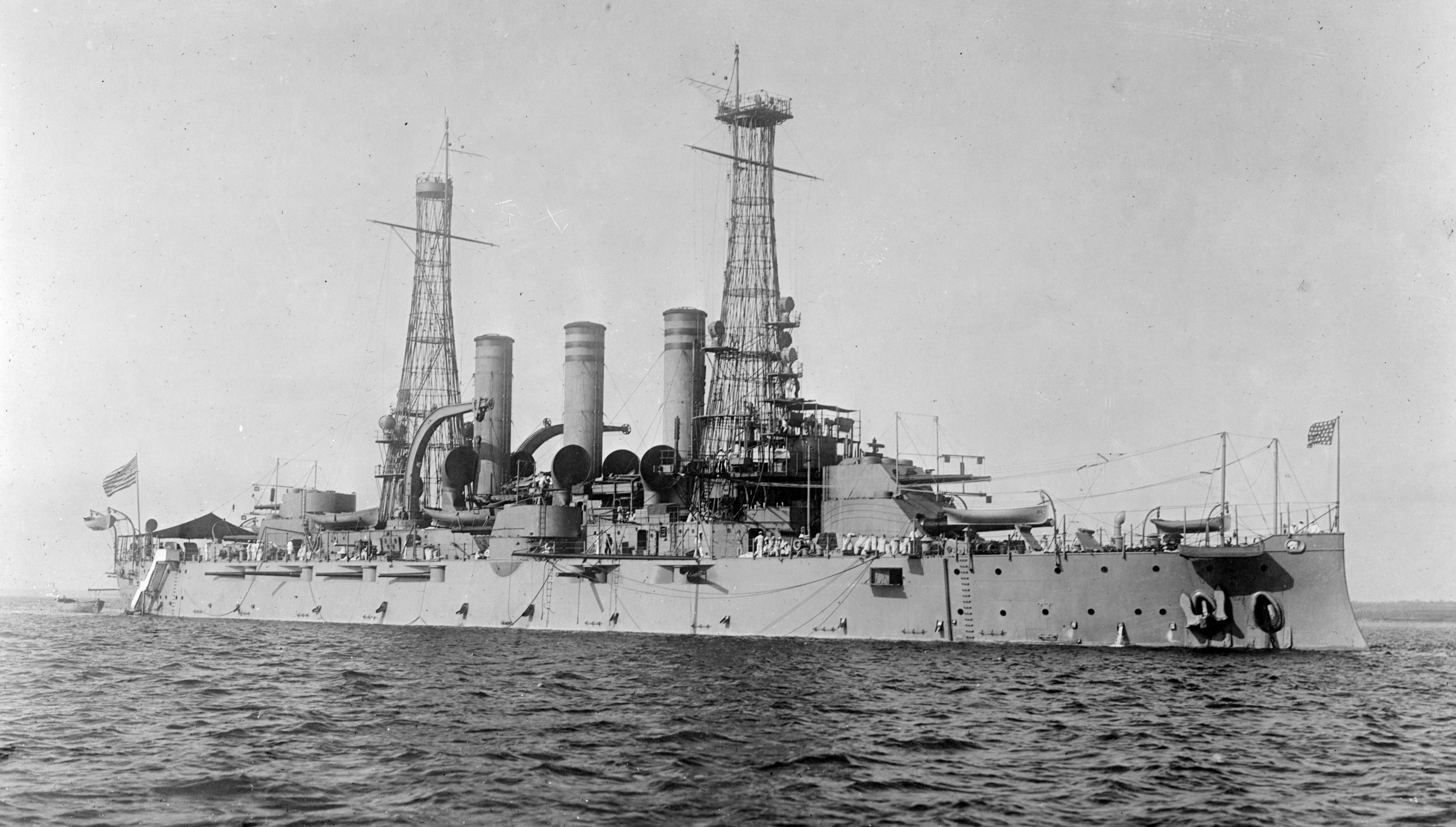
- USS Rhode Island (BB-17) underway

History

United States
- Name: Rhode Island
- Namesake: Rhode Island
- Builder: Fore River Shipyard
- Laid down: 1 May 1902
- Launched: 17 May 1904
- Commissioned: 19 February 1906
- Decommissioned: 30 June 1920
- Fate: Sold for scrap, 1 November 1923

General characteristics
- Class & type: Virginia-class battleship
- Displacement: Normal: 14,948 long tons (15,188 t); Full load: 16,094 long tons (16,352 t)
- Length: 441 ft 3 in (134 m)
- Beam: 76 ft 3 in (23 m)
- Draft: 23 ft 9 in (7 m)
- Installed power: 12 × Babcock & Wilcox boilers; 19,000 ihp (14,000 kW)
- Propulsion: 2 × triple-expansion steam engines; 2 × screw propellers
- Speed: 19 kn (35 km/h; 22 mph)
- Complement: 812
- Armament: 4 × 12 in (305 mm)/40 caliber guns; 8 × 8 in (203 mm)/45 cal guns; 12 × 6 in (152 mm)/50 cal guns; 12 × 3 in (76 mm)/50 cal guns; 12 × 3-pounder guns; 4 × 21 inch (533 mm) torpedo tubes
- Armor: Belt: 6–11 in (152–279 mm); Barbettes: 10 in (254 mm); Turrets: 12 in (305 mm); Conning tower: 9 in (229 mm)

USS Rhode Island (hull number: BB-17) was the last of five Virginia-class battleships built for the United States Navy, and was the second ship to carry her name. She was laid down in May 1902, launched in May 1904, and commissioned into the Atlantic Fleet in February 1906. The ship was armed with an offensive battery of four 12-inch (305 mm) guns and eight 8-inch (203 mm) guns, and she was capable of a top speed of 19 knots (35 km/h; 22 mph).

The ship's career primarily consisted of training with the other battleships of the Atlantic Fleet. Rhode Island took part in the cruise of the Great White Fleet in 1907–1909, and thereafter largely remained in the Atlantic. In late 1913, she cruised the Caribbean coast of Mexico to protect American interests during the Mexican Revolution. After the United States entered World War I in April 1917, Rhode Island was assigned to anti-submarine patrols off the east coast of the US. Starting in December 1918, after the end of the war, the ship was used to repatriate American soldiers. She carried over 5,000 men in the course of five trips. She was briefly transferred to the Pacific Fleet in 1919 before being decommissioned in 1920 and sold for scrap in 1923 under the terms of the Washington Naval Treaty.

== Design ==
Design work on the Virginia class began in 1899, after the United States' victory in the Spanish–American War, which had demonstrated the need for sea-going battleships suitable for operations abroad, finally resolving the debate between proponents of that type and those who favored low-freeboard types useful for coastal defense. The designers included a superposed arrangement of the main and some of the secondary guns, which proved to be a significant disappointment in service, as firing either set of guns interfered with the others, slowing the rate of fire.

Plan and profile of the Virginia class

Rhode Island was 441 feet 3 inches (134.49 m) long overall and had a beam of 76 ft 3 in (23.24 m) and a draft of 23 ft 9 in (7.24 m). She displaced 14,948 long tons (15,188 t) as designed and up to 16,094 long tons (16,352 t) at full load. The ship was powered by two-shaft triple-expansion steam engines rated at 19,000 indicated horsepower (14,000 kW), with steam provided by twelve coal-fired Babcock & Wilcox boilers. The propulsion system generated a top speed of 19 knots (35 km/h; 22 mph). As built, she was fitted with heavy military masts, but these were quickly replaced by cage masts in 1909. She had a crew of 812 officers and enlisted men.

The ship was armed with a main battery of four 12 in (305 mm) /40 caliber Mark 4 (Note: /40 refers to the length of the gun in terms of calibers. A /40 gun is 40 times long as it is in bore diameter.) guns in two twin gun turrets on the centerline, one forward and aft. The secondary battery consisted of eight 8 in (203 mm) /45 caliber guns and twelve 6 in (152 mm) /50 caliber guns. The 8-inch guns were mounted in four twin turrets; two of these were superposed atop the main battery turrets, with the other two turrets abreast the forward funnel. The 6-inch guns were placed in casemates in the hull. For close-range defense against torpedo boats, she carried twelve 3-inch (76 mm)/50 caliber guns mounted in casemates along the side of the hull and twelve 3-pounder guns. She also carried two 1-pounder guns. As was standard for capital ships of the period, Rhode Island carried four 21 inch (533 mm) torpedo tubes, submerged in her hull on the broadside.

Rhode Island's main armored belt was 11 in (279 mm) thick over the magazines and the machinery spaces and 6 in (152 mm) elsewhere. The faces of the main battery gun turrets (and the secondary turrets on top of them) were 12-inch (305 mm) thick. Each turret rested on a supporting barbettes that had 10 in (254 mm) of armor plating. The conning tower had 9 in (229 mm) thick sides.

== Service history ==
=== Early career and the Great White Fleet ===
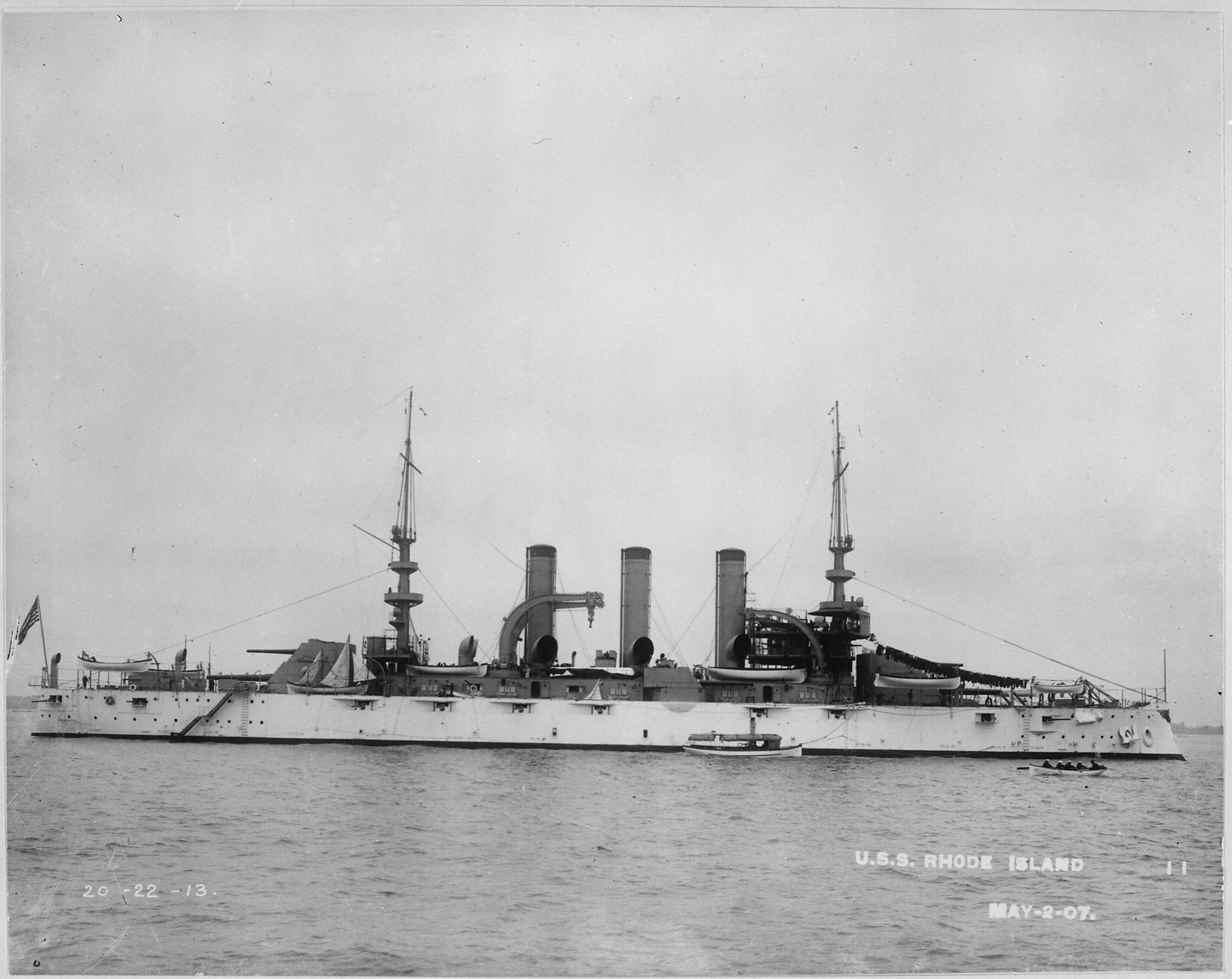
Rhode Island in 1907

Rhode Island was laid down at the Fore River Shipyard in Massachusetts on 1 May 1902 and was launched on 17 May 1904, to little fanfare due to a worker strike at the shipyard. Upon launching, the ship became stuck on a mud bank where she remained before being towed afloat two days later. The ship was completed a year later, and on 19 February 1906 commissioned into the fleet. The ship conducted an extensive shakedown cruise and sea trials before steaming to Hampton Roads, where she was assigned to the 2nd Division of the 1st Squadron, Atlantic Fleet on 1 January 1907. She left Hampton Roads on 9 March 1907, bound for Guantánamo Bay, Cuba. There, she and the rest of the 1st Squadron conducted maneuvers and gunnery training. After the conclusion of these exercises, she returned to the east coast of the United States for a cruise to Cape Cod Bay.

On 8 December, Rhode Island returned to Hampton Roads, where she and fifteen other battleships held a naval review at the start of the cruise of the Great White Fleet. The battleships were joined by transports and a squadron of torpedo boats. On 16 December, President Theodore Roosevelt reviewed the fleet before it departed on the first leg of the trip. The cruise of the Great White Fleet was conceived as a way to demonstrate American military power, particularly to Japan. Tensions had begun to rise between the United States and Japan after the latter's victory in the Russo-Japanese War in 1905, particularly over racist opposition to Japanese immigration to the United States. The press in both countries began to call for war, and Roosevelt hoped to use the demonstration of naval might to deter Japanese aggression. The fleet cruised south to the Caribbean and then to South America, making stops in Port of Spain, Rio de Janeiro, Punta Arenas, and Valparaíso, among other cities. After arriving in Mexico in March 1908, the fleet spent three weeks conducting gunnery practice.

The fleet then resumed its voyage up the Pacific coast of the Americas, stopping in San Francisco and Seattle before crossing the Pacific to Australia, stopping in Hawaii on the way. Stops in the South Pacific included Melbourne, Sydney, and Auckland. The fleet then turned north for the Philippines, stopping in Manila, before continuing on to Japan where a welcoming ceremony was held in Yokohama. Three weeks of exercises followed in Subic Bay in the Philippines in November. The ships passed Singapore on 6 December and entered the Indian Ocean; they coaled in Colombo before proceeding to the Suez Canal and coaling again at Port Said, Egypt. The fleet called in several Mediterranean ports before stopping in Gibraltar, where an international fleet of British, Russian, French, and Dutch warships greeted the Americans. The ships then crossed the Atlantic to return to Hampton Roads on 22 February 1909, having traveled 46,729 nautical miles (86,542 km; 53,775 mi). There, they conducted a naval review for Theodore Roosevelt.

=== 1909–1923 ===
After the conclusion of the review, Rhode Island steamed to New York for an overhaul at the New York Navy Yard. During the overhaul, on 8 March, the ship was assigned to the 3rd Division, 1st Squadron. After emerging from the dry dock, she resumed her normal peacetime routine of maneuvers with the rest of the squadron, gunnery practice, and training cruises. In February 1910 she was sent on a cruise in the Caribbean. The ship was reassigned to the 4th Division, 1st Squadron on 20 October, and two weeks later she and the rest of the squadron held a naval review in Boston for President William Howard Taft on 2 November. The ships then crossed the Atlantic to visit European ports; Rhode Island went to Gravesend. During the cruise, the fleet conducted large scale battle and reconnaissance training. Rhode Island and the rest of the ships recrossed the Atlantic and stopped in Guantánamo Bay on 13 January 1911.

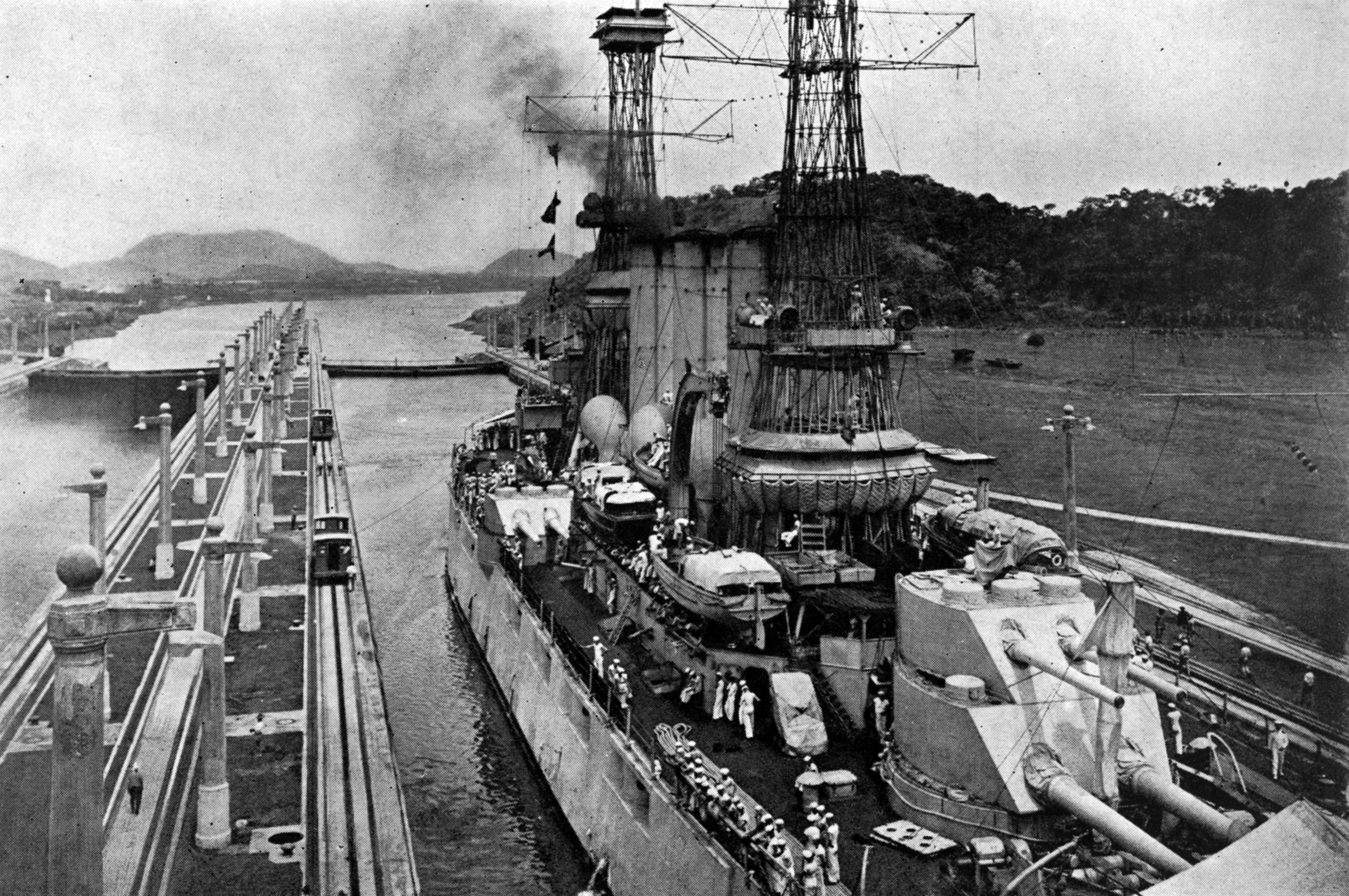
Rhode Island in the Miraflores Locks in the Panama Canal

The ship then resumed her peacetime routine, which lasted for the next three years, punctuated only by a cruise to Key West, Florida and Havana and Guantánamo Bay in Cuba in June – July 1912. Upon her return, she was reassigned temporarily as the flagship of the 3rd Division on 17 July. This duty was short-lived, and on 1 August the divisional commander transferred his flag to her sister ship New Jersey. On 28 June 1913, Rhode Island again became the divisional flagship, and this stint lasted until 18 January 1914. In late 1913, the US Navy began to become increasingly involved in the Mexican Revolution; in late 1913, Rhode Island cruised off Veracruz, Tampico, and Tuxpan to protect American nationals in the country. In February 1914, the ship left the area and stopped in Guantánamo Bay for two weeks before continuing on to the United States to return to her normal routine.

The ship went on two cruises to show the flag in the Caribbean, the first from October 1914 to March 1915, and the second from January to February 1916. During this period, she served as the flagship for the 4th Division, 1st Squadron, from 19 December 1914 to 20 January 1915. On 15 May 1916, she was reduced to the fleet reserve at the Boston Navy Yard, and formally removed from the Atlantic Fleet the following day. From 24 June to 28 September, she served as the flagship of the Commander in Chief, Reserve Force, Atlantic Fleet. Rhode Island was placed back in commission on 27 March 1917, as tensions with Germany rose dramatically as the result of the German unrestricted submarine warfare campaign that had been launched earlier in the year. The United States declared war on 6 April, and on 3 May, the ship became the flagship of Battleship Division 3, Atlantic Fleet. The ship's crew underwent extensive training to bring the ship up to combat readiness before she was assigned to anti-submarine patrols off Tangier Island, Maryland. She was based out of Hampton Roads into 1918.

In April, Rhode Island was transferred to Battleship Division 2, and in June, she conducted torpedo proving trials. At the end of the war in November, the ship was assigned to the operation to transport American soldiers back from France. The first trip started on 18 December; Rhode Island and Virginia steamed to Brest, France, where they arrived on 30 December. The two ships took on 2,043 men between them during a three-day stay in the port. Over the course of four further trips, the last of which ended on 4 July 1919, she carried more than 5,000 men to Boston. On 17 July, she was assigned as the flagship of Battleship Squadron 1, Pacific Fleet. She left Boston five days later and cruised down to Balboa, at the entrance to the Panama Canal. After transiting the canal, Rhode Island steamed north, to Mare Island Navy Yard, where she remained through 1920. On 30 June, she was decommissioned and placed in reserve. According to the terms of the 1922 Washington Naval Treaty, Rhode Island was sold for scrap on 1 November 1923 and broken up. The ship's bell is preserved on display at the Rhode Island State House.
