= William Wirt Kimball =

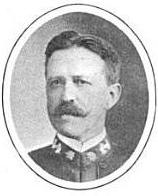
- Born: January 9, 1848; Paris, Maine
- Died: January 26, 1930 (aged 82); Washington, D.C.
- Military career
- Allegiance: United States of America
- Branch: United States Navy
- Service years: 1869–1910
- Rank: Rear Admiral
- Conflicts: Spanish–American War

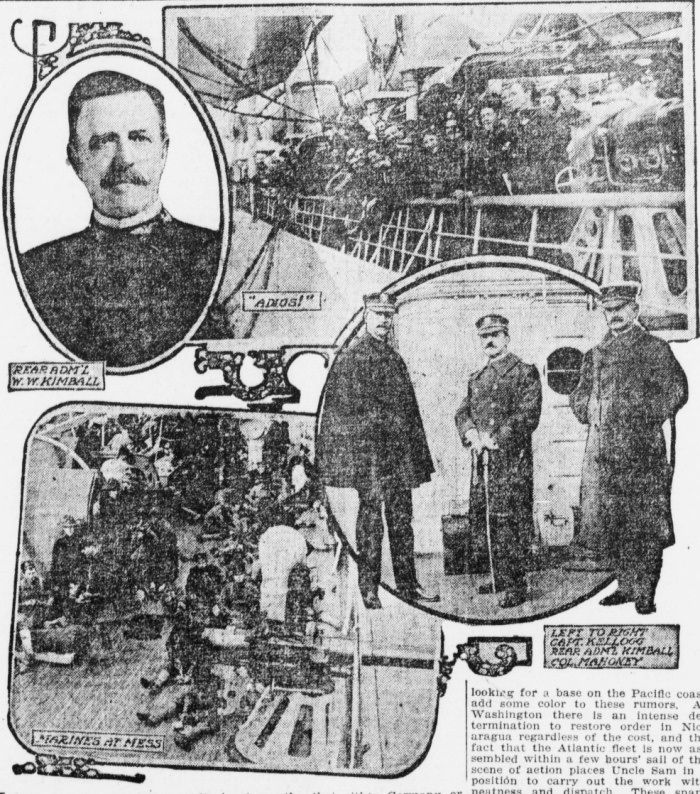
Kimball at top left and with other officers on U.S. Navy ship to Nicaragua in this newspaper compilation, 1909

William Wirt Kimball (January 9, 1848 – January 26, 1930) was a U.S. naval officer and an early pioneer in the development of submarines.

== Biography ==
Kimball was born in Paris, Maine, and graduated from the United States Naval Academy in Annapolis in 1869.

After serving on early navy torpedo boats, Kimball designed machine guns and armored cars, later shifting his focus to the development of submarines in the 1890s.

He commanded the Atlantic torpedo-boat fleet during the Spanish–American War.

In May 1906, he became the first commander of the battleship New Jersey. Kimball was promoted to rear admiral in 1908 and led expeditionary forces to Nicaragua in 1909. He retired from active duty in 1910.

Kimball died in Washington, D.C., on January 26, 1930, at the age of 82.
