= CSS Georgia =

Several ships of the Confederate States Navy have borne the name CSS Georgia, after Georgia:

- CSS Georgia (1862), a screw steamer acquired in 1863, and captured by the Union Navy in 1864
- CSS Georgia (1863), an ironclad warship built in 1862 and decommissioned in 1864

== See also ==
- CSS Georgiana
- USS Georgia
- Georgia (disambiguation)
