= 6-inch/50-caliber gun =

6"/50 caliber Mark 6 and Mark 8
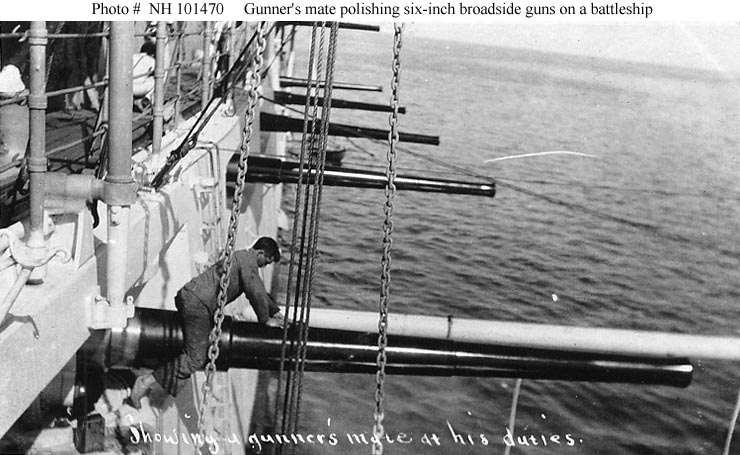
- USS Ohio (BB-12), 6-inch/50 caliber guns.
- Type: Naval gun; Coastal defence
- Place of origin: United States

Service history
- In service: 1903
- Used by: United States Navy
- Wars: World War I; World War II

Production history
- Designer: Bureau of Ordnance
- Designed: 1898
- Manufacturer: U.S. Naval Gun Factory; Midvale Steel
- Produced: 1900–1917
- No. built: Mark 6: 136 (Nos. 197, 210–259, 277–359, 421–422); Mark 8: 215 (Nos. 360–420, 427–510, 525–594)
- Variants: Mark 6 and Mark 8

Specifications
- Mass: 18,112 lb (8,215 kg) (without breech); 18,628 lb (8,450 kg) (with breech)
- Length: 300.2 in (7,630 mm)
- Barrel length: 294 in (7,500 mm) bore (49 calibers)
- Shell: 105 lb (48 kg) naval armor-piercing
- Caliber: 6 in (152 mm)
- Elevation: −10° to +15°
- Traverse: −100° to +100°
- Rate of fire: 6 rounds per minute
- Muzzle velocity: 2,800 ft/s (850 m/s)
- Effective firing range: 15,000 yd (14,000 m) at 14.9° elevation WWI charge; 16,000 yd (15,000 m) at 15° elevation WWII charge

The 6"/50 caliber gun Mark 6 and Mark 8 (spoken "six-inch-fifty-caliber") were used for the secondary batteries of the United States Navy's Maine-class and Virginia-class battleships, as well as the Pennsylvania-class and Tennessee-class armored cruisers. They were also used as the main battery on the St. Louis-class protected cruisers.

== Design ==
The 6-inch (152 mm)/50 caliber Mark 6 guns were developed around the time of the Spanish–American War. The gun card designates the gun as 46-caliber but the Bureau of Ordnance lists the guns as 50-caliber.

The Mark 6 gun was constructed of gun steel using a tube, jacket, four hoops, a locking ring, and Welin breech block. It was discovered that the pressure curve of the charge and the strength curve of the barrel match exactly along one point of the barrel, because of this the muzzle velocity was reduced from the original 2,800 ft/s (850 m/s) to 2,600 ft/s (790 m/s). With the Mod 1 nickel-steel was used for the tube, two hoops and the locking ring, the gun was also hooped to the muzzle, because of this, the original muzzle velocity was able to be restored. The Mod 2 were Mod 0s with a hoop added to the chase along with a cylindrical liner made from nickel-steel. With these changes the original muzzle velocity was used.

The Mark 8 was similar to the Mark 6 Mod 1 but was constructed entirely out of nickel steel. The Mod 1 had a slightly smaller diameter chamber, but the same volume. The Mod 2 had its rifling grooves increased to 36 from 24 and didn't have the modified chamber of the Mod 1. The Mod 3 had a cylindrical liner made of nickel-steel along with a new chamber design and 36 grooves. Mod 4 used an earlier gun that had its liner replaced with a conical nickel-steel liner along with 36 grooves and the chamber of the Mod 3.

This gun is also unusual for the US Navy where the overall length of the gun barrel, 300.2 in (7,630 mm), is used to measure the caliber of the gun. (i.e.:300.2/6=50) Normally the bore length, 294 in (7,500 mm), would be used and this would actually be a 49 caliber gun. (i.e.:294/6=49)

== Naval Service ==
Ship	Gun Installed	Gun Mount
USS Maine (BB-10)	Mark 6: 6"/50 caliber	Mark 10: 16 × single mounts
USS Missouri (BB-11)	Mark 6: 6"/50 caliber	Mark 10: 16 × single mounts
USS Ohio (BB-12)	Mark 6: 6"/50 caliber	Mark 10: 16 × single mounts
USS Virginia (BB-13)	Mark 6: 6"/50 caliber	Mark 10: 12 × single mounts
USS Nebraska (BB-14)	Mark 6: 6"/50 caliber	Mark 10: 12 × single mounts
USS Georgia (BB-15)	Mark 6: 6"/50 caliber	Mark 10: 12 × single mounts
USS New Jersey (BB-16)	Mark 6: 6"/50 caliber	Mark 10: 12 × single mounts
USS Rhode Island (BB-17)	Mark 6: 6"/50 caliber	Mark 10: 12 × single mounts
USS St. Louis (C-20)	Mark 6: 6"/50 caliber	Mark 10: 14 × single mounts
USS Milwaukee (C-21)	Mark 8: 6"/50 caliber	Mark 10: 14 × single mounts
USS Charleston (C-22)	Mark 6: 6"/50 caliber	Mark 10: 14 × single mounts
USS Pennsylvania (ACR-4)	Mark 6: 6"/50 caliber	Mark 10: 14 × single mounts
USS West Virginia (ACR-5)	Mark 6: 6"/50 caliber	Mark 10: 14 × single mounts
USS California (ACR-6)	Mark 6: 6"/50 caliber	Mark 10: 14 × single mounts
USS Colorado (ACR-7)	Mark 6: 6"/50 caliber	Mark 10: 14 × single mounts
USS Maryland (ACR-8)	Mark 6: 6"/50 caliber	Mark 10: 14 × single mounts
USS South Dakota (ACR-9)	Mark 6: 6"/50 caliber	Mark 10: 14 × single mounts
USS Tennessee (ACR-10)	Mark 8: 6"/50 caliber	Mark 10: 14 × single mounts
USS Washington (ACR-11)	Mark 8: 6"/50 caliber	Mark 10: 14 × single mounts
USS North Carolina (ACR-12)	Mark 8: 6"/50 caliber	Mark 10: 14 × single mounts
USS Montana (ACR-13)	Mark 8: 6"/50 caliber	Mark 10: 14 × single mounts

The Maines had their guns reduced to eight in 1909, the guns would go on to arm auxiliary ships during World War I and again in World War II. After WW I, and as a result of the signing of the Washington Naval Treaty, many of these ships were scrapped; the guns were later put to use as coastal artillery.

== Coast defense locations ==
6"/50 caliber ex-Navy guns were emplaced during World War II at numerous locations; most were operated by the United States Army Coast Artillery Corps. This list may not be exhaustive. They were grouped into two-gun batteries unless otherwise noted. Most of the batteries in CONUS were disestablished in 1943 as new defenses were built or the threat abated.

- Two guns near Fort Macon, Beaufort, NC
- Two guns near Freeport, TX
- Two guns in Battery Lobos, Fort Miley, San Francisco, CA
- Six guns in a two-gun and a four-gun battery, temporary defenses of Grays Harbor, Westport, WA
- Two guns in Battery Allen, Fort Babcock, Sitka, AK
- Two guns each in Alaska at Cold Bay, Chernofski, Umnak, George Island (one gun), Yakutat, Nome, Annette Island, Adak Island, Shemya Island, and Popof Island
- Two guns each in Batteries 954 and 604, Shalloway Point and Latine Point, Fort McAndrew, Argentia, Newfoundland
- Four guns in two batteries at Blunt's Point and Breakers Point, Pago Pago, American Samoa
- Four guns at Paramaribo, Suriname (formerly Dutch Guiana)

== Surviving examples ==
Surviving 6"/50 caliber naval guns include:

- One Mark 8 gun, Naval Gun Factory 368, Nome airport, AK
- Two guns, Cannon Beach, Yakutat, AK
- One gun, city dump, Cold Bay, AK
- One gun, George Island, Cross Sound, AK
- Two Mark 8 Mod 2 guns, Midvale Nos. 550 and 554, Blunts Point, Pago Pago, American Samoa
- Two Mark 8 Mod 2 guns, Breakers Point, Pago Pago, American Samoa
- Four guns, Paramaribo, Suriname (formerly Dutch Guiana). One is a Mark 6 Mod 1, No. 309L, another is a Mark 6 Mod 2, No. 314L

== See also ==
- 6"/30 caliber gun - includes 6"/40 caliber Mark 3 guns
- 6-inch gun M1897 - Army coast defense weapon of similar type and era

=== Weapons of comparable role, performance and era ===
- BL 6 inch Mk XI naval gun British equivalent
- 15 cm/50 41st Year Type Japanese equivalent

== Bibliography ==
- Berhow, Mark A., ed. (2015). American Seacoast Defenses, A Reference Guide (Third ed.). McLean, Virginia: CDSG Press. ISBN 978-0-9748167-3-9.
- Friedman, Norman (2011). Naval Weapons of World War One. Seaforth Publishing. p. 180. ISBN 978-1-84832-100-7.
- "United States of America 6"/50 (15.2 cm) Mark 6 and Mark 8". Navweaps. 2 May 2015.
