= State of Georgia (disambiguation) =

State of Georgia is the official name of Georgia, a state of the United States of America.

State of Georgia may also refer to:

== Places ==
- Georgia (country), the state, nation, country of Georgia in the Caucasus, a former Soviet republic
- State of Georgia Building, Atlanta, Georgia, United States; an office building

== Other uses ==
- Bank of the State of Georgia (1873–1917), a defunct bank in the U.S.
- USS State of Georgia, a U.S. Navy shipname
  - USS State of Georgia (1851), a Union Navy gunboat steamer of the American Civil War
- State of Georgia (TV series), 2011 U.S. TV show

== See also ==
- State of the State address for the U.S. state of Georgia
- Georgia state (disambiguation)
- Georgia (disambiguation)
