= Georgia state =

Georgia state or variation, may refer to:

== Primarily ==
- Georgia State University ("State", "Georgia State"), a state university
- Georgia (U.S. state) ("Georgia state"), a state of the United States of America

== Sports ==
- Georgia State Panthers, the sports teams representing Georgia State University
- Georgia State Stadium, Atlanta, Georgia, USA
- Georgia State Baseball Complex, Decatur, Georgia, USA
- Georgia State League, a class-D basketball league in the Georgia state, USA

== Other uses ==
- Georgia State station, Atlanta, Georgia, USA; a train station
- Georgia State College, Savannah, Georgia, USA; founded as an HBCU
- Georgia State Prison, Reidsville, Georgia, USA; a maximum security penitentiary
- Georgia State Hospital, Milledgeville, Georgia, USA

== See also ==
- State of Georgia (disambiguation)
- Georgia (disambiguation)
