= Mișu =

Mișu is a Romanian-language first name and surname, most often a pet form of the name Mihai ("Michael")—its intermediate origin is the French affectionate name Michou (also Michoux and Michoud), from Michel. Used on its own, it may refer to:

== People ==
=== First name ===
- Mișu Benvenisti (1902–1977), Romanian Zionist leader
- Mișu Dulgheru (1909–2002), Romanian communist activist and spy
- Mișu Popp (1827–1892), Romanian painter and muralist
- Mișu Văcărescu (1840s–1903), Romanian fashion journalist and gossip columnist

=== Last name ===
- Georgian Mișu (born 2001), Romanian professional footballer
- Nicolae Mișu (1858–1924), Romanian politician and diplomat

== Places ==
- Mișu River
