= Republic of Georgia (disambiguation) =

Republic of Georgia was the official name used from 1990 to 1995 by the modern state of Georgia.

Republic of Georgia may also refer to the modern Georgian state during specific historical and constitutional phases:

- Democratic Republic of Georgia, also known as the "First Republic of Georgia", 1918–1921
- Georgian Soviet Socialist Republic, a part of the Soviet Union, 1921–1990
