= Georgian International Academy =

Research and academic institution in Tbilisi, Georgia

- Latin: Georgiana Internationalis Academia
- Motto: Incipit Vita Nova! (Latin) ახალი ცხოვრება იწყება! (Georgian)
- Motto in English: A New Life Begins!
- Type: Private
- Affiliations: Georgia-Ukraine Institute of Social Relations; International Personnel Academy; Iakob Gogebashvili Society
- President: Gari T. Chapidze
- Provost: Rudolf Semyonov
- Location: 7 Javakheti St., Isani-Samgori District,, Tbilisi, Georgia; 41°41′38.5″N 44°52′15″E
- Colors: Georgian International Academy Green
- Website: www.chemisakartvelo.ge

Georgian International Academy (Georgian: საქართველოს საერთაშორისო აკადემია) is a private institution located in Isani-Samgori District, Tbilisi, Georgia. The academy is one of the few Georgian institutions which awards the degree “Doctor Academician”.

Georgian International Academy also operates a junior college – a two-year post-secondary school whose main purpose is to provide academic, vocational and professional education.

== History ==
Georgian International Academy was founded in Georgia by members of the Fazisi Academy, which was established in the 2nd century BC. The Academy traces its modern roots to 1812. It was officially registered in the newly formed Republic of Georgia in 2003, a result of the breakup of the Soviet Union and its National Academy of Sciences. A mission of the Academy is to create a collaborative platform for the academic community and scholars of Georgia and the affiliated institutions. Its community consists of scientists and academics who are engaged in original and innovative research at the doctoral and post-doctoral levels in various scholastic fields.

== Schools and affiliates ==
Georgian International Academy is affiliated with several regional educational institutions including the International Personnel Academy (IPA) in the country of Ukraine, which offers Bachelor of Science and Master of Science degrees in several disciplines.

Georgian International Academy also administers the Georgia-Ukraine Institute of Social Relations, an educational institution. It offers learning platforms which start with early childhood education and continues through the graduate school. Every step of the education process is under the umbrella of a single institution. The school is currently engaged in building a similar comprehensive educational institution in Rustavi, – a large industrial city, outside of the capital city, Tbilisi.

Georgian International Academy houses and administers the Gogebashvili Society – the largest pedagogic society and the De Facto teachers’ union in Georgia. The society is an advocacy group dedicated to preserving the ancient Iberian pedagogic and educational values among all Georgians.

== Graduate school ==
Georgian International Academy offers several research-based Doctoral degrees and several post-doctoral programs. These honors are conferred on the basis of a research study or a dissertation. Research doctorates are awarded in recognition of academic research that is (at least in principle) publishable in a peer-refereed academic journal. Research studies are independent and require no academic collaboration or supervision. The Dissertations require direct academic supervision and in some cases collaboration. The post-graduate degree is the degree Doctor of Philosophy (Ph.D.) and it is offered in several academic disciplines. The post-graduate title is Doctor Academician – the highest academic title in Europe. Concentrations are offered in the fields of philosophy, economics, and political science.

== Academic and organizational structure ==
The Great Academic Council is the administrative body of the Georgian International Academy. It is an exclusive academic organization where every member is required to have a Ph.D. degree, and hold the academic title Doctor Academician. The political scientist and scholar of journalism, Dr. Academician Gari T. Chapidze serves as the current Chairman of the Great Academic Council, as well as the President of Georgian International Academy. Dr. Academician Rudolf Semyonov serves as the Vice Chairman.
