= USS New Jersey (BB-16) =

Pre-dreadnought battleship of the United States Navy

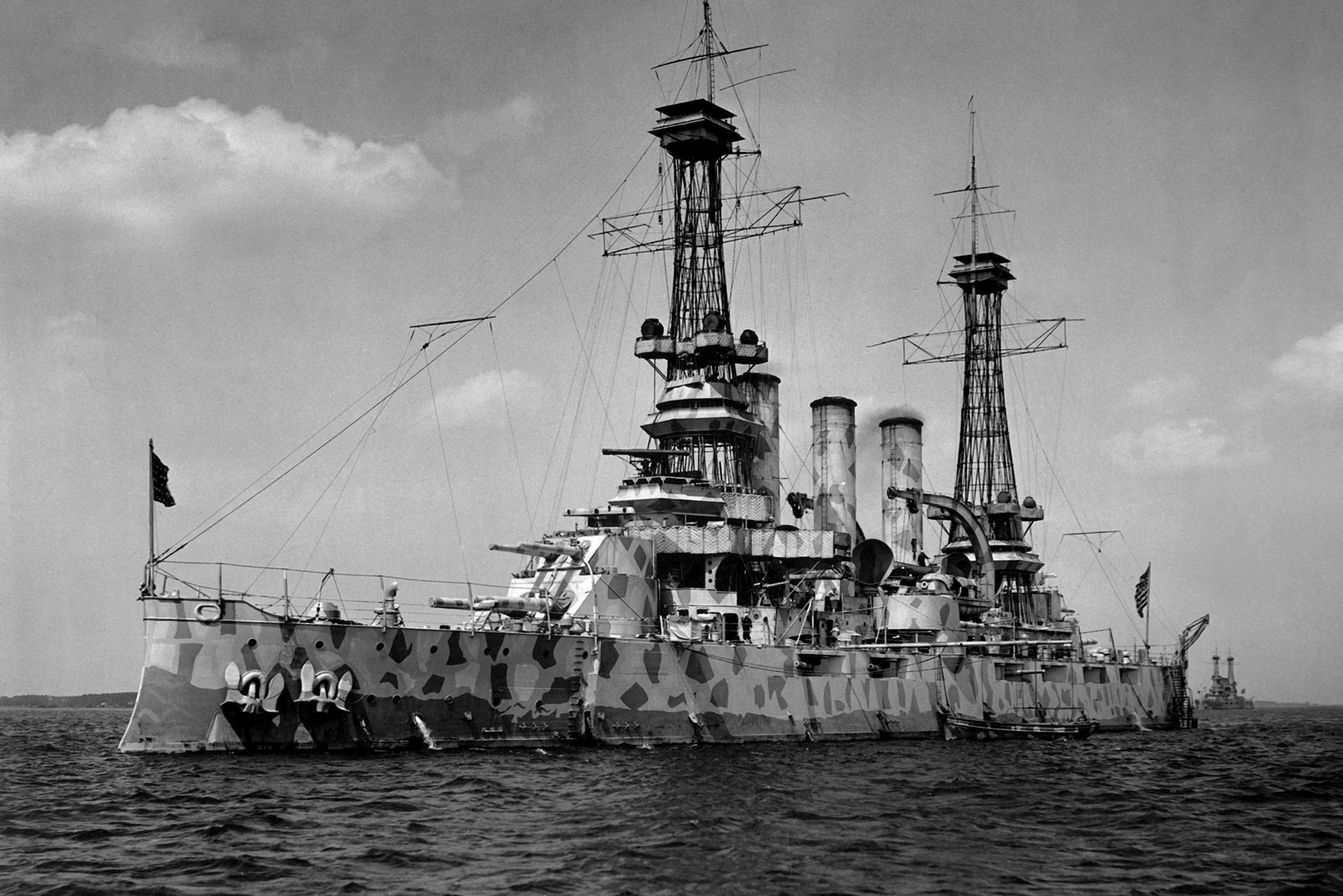
- USS New Jersey (BB-16) in a camouflage paint scheme, 1918

History

United States
- Name: New Jersey
- Namesake: New Jersey
- Builder: Fore River Shipyard
- Laid down: 3 April 1902
- Launched: 10 November 1904
- Commissioned: 12 May 1906
- Decommissioned: 6 August 1920
- Stricken: 12 July 1922
- Fate: Sunk as target 5 September 1923

General characteristics
- Class & type: Virginia-class battleship
- Displacement: Normal: 14,948 long tons (15,188 t); Full load: 16,094 long tons (16,352 t)
- Length: 441 ft 3 in (134 m)
- Beam: 76 ft 3 in (23 m)
- Draft: 23 ft 9 in (7 m)
- Installed power: 12 × Babcock & Wilcox boilers; 19,000 ihp (14,000 kW)
- Propulsion: 2 × triple-expansion steam engines; 2 × screw propellers
- Speed: 19 kn (35 km/h; 22 mph)
- Complement: 812
- Armament: 4 × 12 in (305 mm)/40 caliber guns; 8 × 8 in (203 mm)/45 cal guns; 12 × 6 in (152 mm)/50 cal guns; 12 × 3 in (76 mm)/50 cal guns; 12 × 3-pounder guns; 4 × 21 inch (533 mm) torpedo tubes
- Armor: Belt: 6–11 in (152–279 mm); Barbettes: 10 in (254 mm); Turrets: 12 in (305 mm); Conning tower: 9 in (229 mm)

USS New Jersey (hull number BB-16) was the fourth of five Virginia-class battleships of the United States Navy, and the first ship to carry her name. She was laid down at the Fore River Shipbuilding Company in Quincy, Massachusetts, in May 1902, launched in November 1904, and commissioned into the fleet in May 1906. The ship was armed with an offensive battery of four 12-inch (305 mm) guns and eight 8-inch (203 mm) guns, and she was capable of a top speed of 19 knots (35 km/h; 22 mph).

New Jersey spent her entire career in the Atlantic Fleet. In late 1906, she took part in the Second Occupation of Cuba, and she participated in the Jamestown Exposition in April – May 1907. At the end of the year, she joined the Great White Fleet for its circumnavigation of the globe, which lasted into 1909. The ship spent the following five years conducting peacetime training. In April 1914, New Jersey took part in the occupation of Veracruz during the Mexican Revolution. During World War I, she was used as a training ship, and after the war, she was tasked with transporting American soldiers back from Europe. New Jersey was decommissioned in 1920 and slated for destruction in bombing tests in 1923. Martin NBS-1 bombers sank the ship on 5 September 1923 in a series of bomb attacks.

== Design ==
Design work on the Virginia class began in 1899, after the United States' victory in the Spanish–American War, which had demonstrated the need for sea-going battleships suitable for operations abroad, finally resolving the debate between proponents of that type and those who favored low-freeboard types useful for coastal defense. The designers included a superposed arrangement of the main and some of the secondary guns, which proved to be a significant disappointment in service, as firing either set of guns interfered with the others, slowing the rate of fire.

Plan and profile of the Virginia class

New Jersey was 441 feet 3 inches (134.49 m) long overall and had a beam of 76 ft 3 in (23.24 m) and a draft of 23 ft 9 in (7.24 m). She displaced 14,948 long tons (15,188 t) as designed and up to 16,094 long tons (16,352 t) at full load. The ship was powered by two-shaft triple-expansion steam engines rated at 19,000 indicated horsepower (14,000 kW), with steam provided by twelve coal-fired Babcock & Wilcox boilers. The propulsion system generated a top speed of 19 knots (35 km/h; 22 mph). As built, she was fitted with heavy military masts, but these were quickly replaced by cage masts in 1909. She had a crew of 812 officers and enlisted men.

The ship was armed with a main battery of four 12 in (305 mm) /40 caliber Mark 4 (Note: /40 refers to the length of the gun in terms of calibers. A /40 gun is 40 times long as it is in bore diameter.) guns in two twin gun turrets on the centerline, one forward and aft. The secondary battery consisted of eight 8 in (203 mm) /45 caliber guns and twelve 6 in (152 mm) /50 caliber guns. The 8-inch guns were mounted in four twin turrets; two of these were superposed atop the main battery turrets, with the other two turrets abreast the forward funnel. The 6-inch guns were placed in casemates in the hull. For close-range defense against torpedo boats, she carried twelve 3-inch (76 mm)/50 caliber guns mounted in casemates along the side of the hull and twelve 3-pounder guns. She also carried two 1-pounder guns. As was standard for capital ships of the period, New Jersey carried four 21 inch (533 mm) torpedo tubes, submerged in her hull on the broadside.

New Jersey's main armored belt was 11 in (279 mm) thick over the magazines and the machinery spaces and 6 in (152 mm) elsewhere. The faces of the main battery gun turrets (and the secondary turrets on top of them) were 12-inch (305 mm) thick. Each turret rested on a supporting barbettes that had 10 in (254 mm) of armor plating. The conning tower had 9 in (229 mm) thick sides.

== Service history ==
=== Early career and Great White Fleet ===
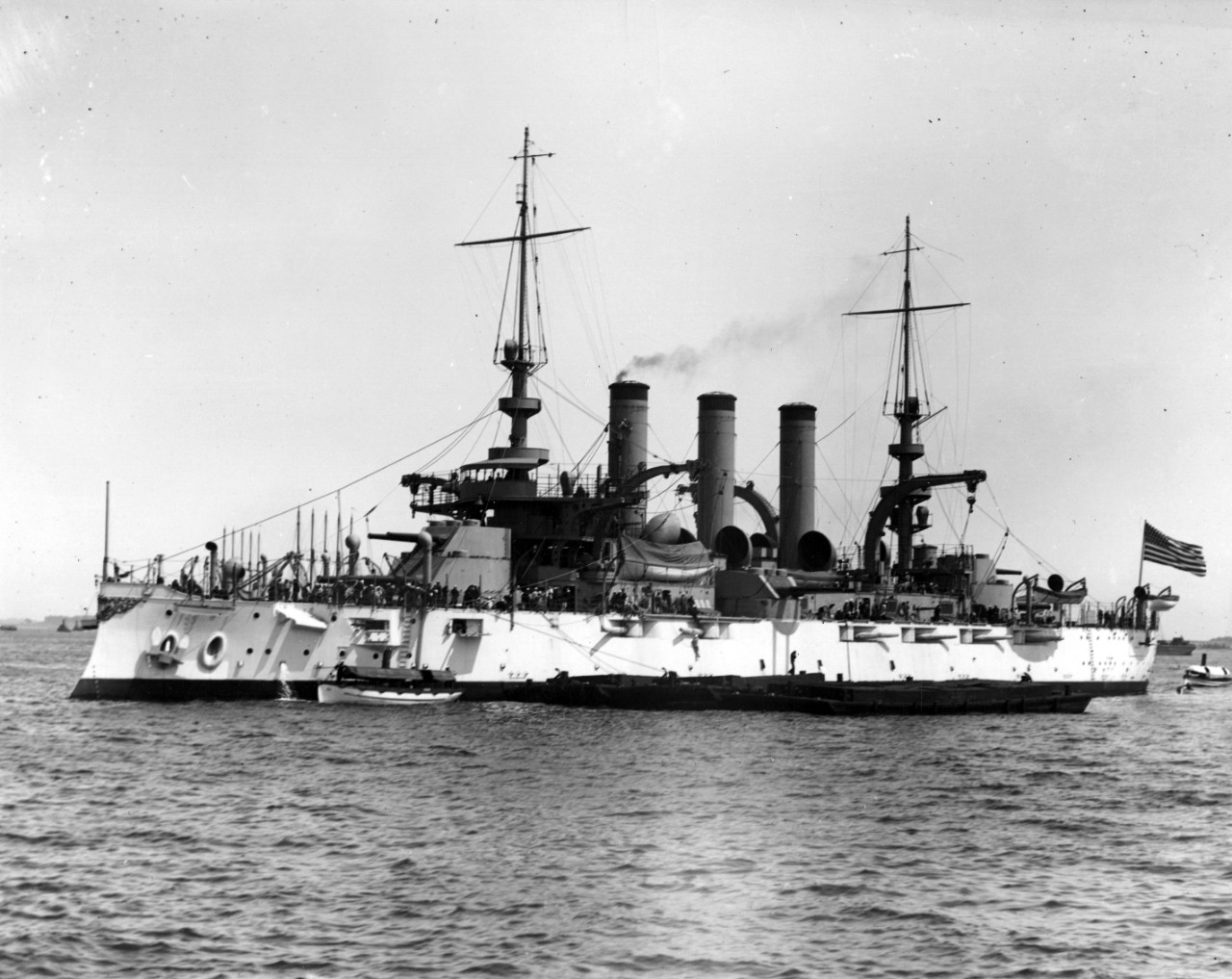
New Jersey as completed

The keel for New Jersey was laid down at the Fore River Shipyard on 3 April 1902. She was launched on 10 November 1904; the daughter of Franklin Murphy, then the Governor of New Jersey, christened the ship. She was commissioned into the US fleet on 12 May 1906, Captain William Kimball in command. New Jersey began her initial training in the Atlantic and Caribbean, which was interrupted by a naval review for President Theodore Roosevelt in Oyster Bay in September. On 21 September, the ship was deployed to Cuba to take part in the Second Occupation of Cuba; she remained there until 13 October. New Jersey participated in the Jamestown Exposition from 15 April to 14 May 1907, which commemorated the 300th anniversary of the founding of the Jamestown colony. An international fleet that included British, French, German, Japanese, and Austro-Hungarian warships joined the US Navy at the event.

New Jersey joined the Great White Fleet on 16 December 1907, when they departed Hampton Roads to begin their circumnavigation of the globe. The cruise of the Great White Fleet was conceived as a way to demonstrate American military power, particularly to Japan. Tensions had begun to rise between the United States and Japan after the latter's victory in the Russo-Japanese War in 1905, particularly over racist opposition to Japanese immigration to the United States. The press in both countries began to call for war, and Roosevelt hoped to use the demonstration of naval might to deter Japanese aggression. The fleet cruised south to the Caribbean and then to South America, making stops in Port of Spain, Rio de Janeiro, Punta Arenas, and Valparaíso, among other cities. After arriving in Mexico in March 1908, the fleet spent three weeks conducting gunnery practice. The fleet then resumed its voyage up the Pacific coast of the Americas, stopping in San Francisco and Seattle before crossing the Pacific to Australia, stopping in Hawaii on the way. Stops in the South Pacific included Melbourne, Sydney, and Auckland.

After leaving Australia, the fleet turned north for the Philippines, stopping in Manila, before continuing on to Japan where a welcoming ceremony was held in Yokohama, which helped to defuse tensions between the two countries. Three weeks of exercises followed in Subic Bay in the Philippines in November. The ships passed Singapore on 6 December and entered the Indian Ocean; they coaled in Colombo before proceeding to the Suez Canal and coaling again at Port Said, Egypt. The fleet called in several Mediterranean ports before stopping in Gibraltar, where an international fleet of British, Russian, French, and Dutch warships greeted the Americans. The ships then crossed the Atlantic to return to Hampton Roads on 22 February 1909, having traveled 46,729 nautical miles (86,542 km; 53,775 mi). There, they conducted a naval review for Theodore Roosevelt.

=== 1910–1923 ===
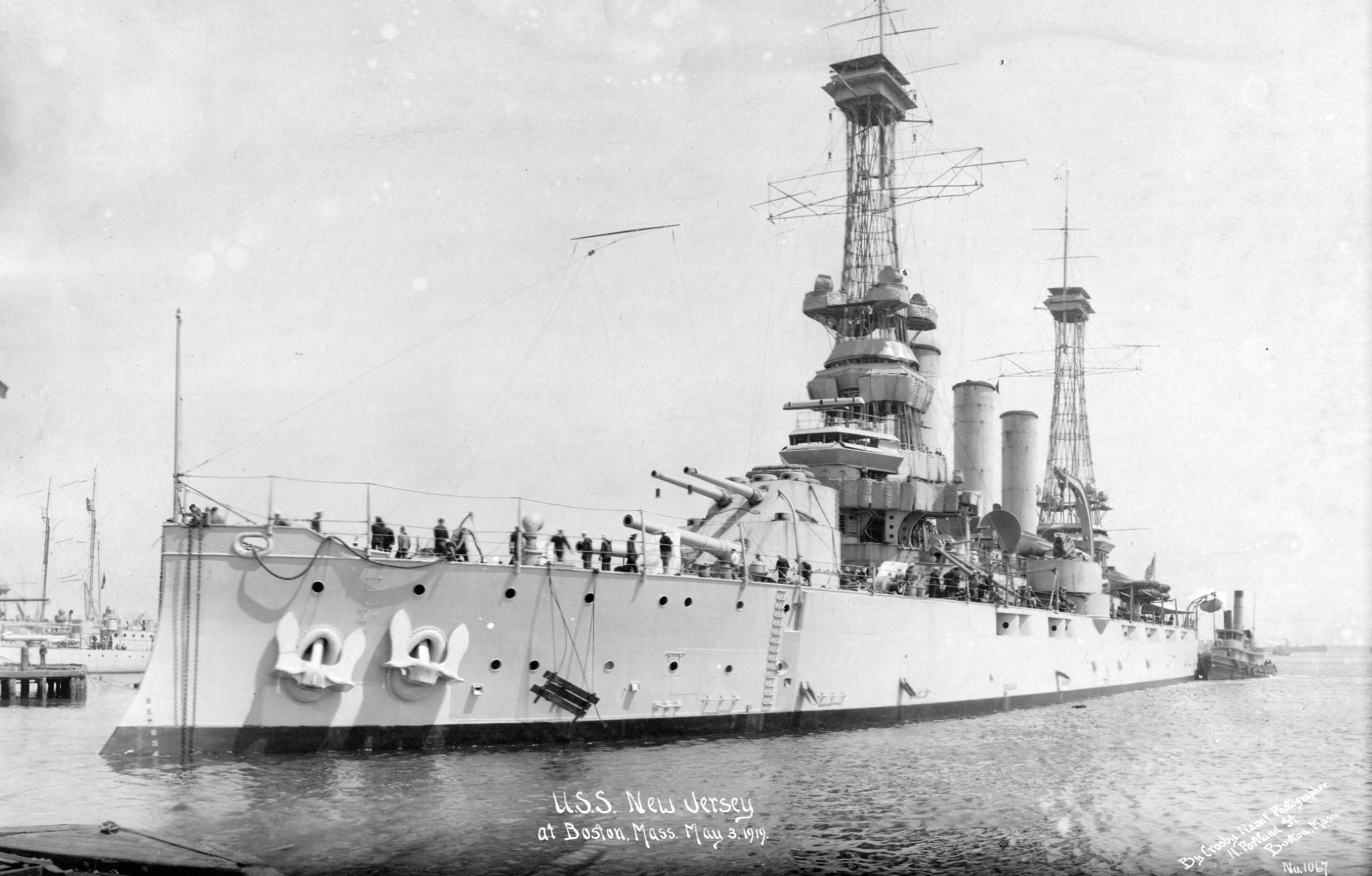
New Jersey in Boston on 3 May 1919; note the 6-inch guns have been removed

New Jersey spent the next several years in the peacetime routine of the Atlantic Fleet, with various training maneuvers and gunnery practice in the Atlantic and Caribbean. During this period, she spent a year out of commission at Boston from 2 May 1910 to 15 July 1911, and in the summers of 1912 and 1913, she conducted training cruises for midshipmen from the United States Naval Academy. The ship was deployed to the Caribbean to protect American interests as the Mexican Revolution worsened in late 1913. On 21 April 1914, the United States occupied Veracruz in the aftermath of the Tampico Affair. On 13 August, New Jersey departed Mexican waters and steamed to Santo Domingo, where unrest gripped both the Dominican Republic and Haiti. After observing conditions in the two countries, the ship continued on, arriving in Hampton Roads on 9 October. She spent the next three years conducting her normal training routine.

On 6 April 1917, the United States declared war on Germany owing to the unrestricted submarine warfare campaign Germany initiated earlier that year. New Jersey was employed as a training ship for naval draftees, based in Chesapeake Bay. In November 1918, Germany signed the Armistice that ended the war; New Jersey was thereafter used to transport American soldiers back from Europe. In the course of four voyages between late 1918 and 9 June 1919, she carried some 5,000 soldiers. New Jersey was decommissioned on 6 August 1920 at the Boston Naval Shipyard, and was to be disposed of under the terms of the Washington Naval Treaty signed in 1922. New Jersey, along with her sister Virginia and the battleship Alabama were allocated for weapons tests conducted with the US Army Air Service, under the supervision of General Billy Mitchell.

The bombing tests against New Jersey were conducted on 5 September 1923 in the Atlantic Ocean off Diamond Shoals, North Carolina, by Martin NBS-1 bombers of the 2nd Bombardment Group. Observers were aboard the Army transport ship St. Mihiel. Four of the NBS-1s attacked New Jersey with 600-pound (270 kg) bombs at an altitude of 10,000 feet (3,000 m), scoring four hits and several near-misses, which caused significant flooding. Another attack was made, this time with 2,000-pound (910 kg) bombs at 6,000 feet (1,800 m), seven of which landed close to the ship. By this time, flooding had increased to the point that the casemate gun ports were submerged. Two more NBS-1s then attacked with two 1,100-pound (500 kg) bombs apiece; the first two missed but the third was a direct hit. It caused a large explosion and New Jersey capsized and sank 24 minutes later.
