= Georgian Mișu =

Romanian footballer

Personal information
- Full name: Ionel Georgian Mișu
- Date of birth: 24 July 2001 (age 25)
- Place of birth: Drobeta-Turnu Severin, Romania
- Height: 1.85 m (6 ft 1 in)
- Position: Goalkeeper

Youth career
- CS Turnu Severin CSS Drobeta
- Concordia Chiajna

Senior career*
Years	Team	Apps	(Gls)
2017–2018	Șirineasa	5	(0)
2018–2022	Concordia Chiajna	2	(0)
2020	→ Mostiștea Ulmu (loan)	11	(0)
2020–2021	→ Metalul Buzău (loan)	7	(0)
2021–2022	→ Viitorul Șimian (loan)	16	(0)
2025/2026	Gilortul Tg Carbunesti	20	(0)
- * Club domestic league appearances and goals as of 31 May 2026

Ionel Georgian Mișu (born 24 July 2001) is a Romanian professional footballer who plays as a goalkeeper. He made his debut in Liga I on 2 June 2019, in a match between Gaz Metan Mediaș and Concordia Chiajna, ended with the score of 3-1.
