= USS Georgia (BB-15) =

Pre-dreadnought battleship of the United States Navy

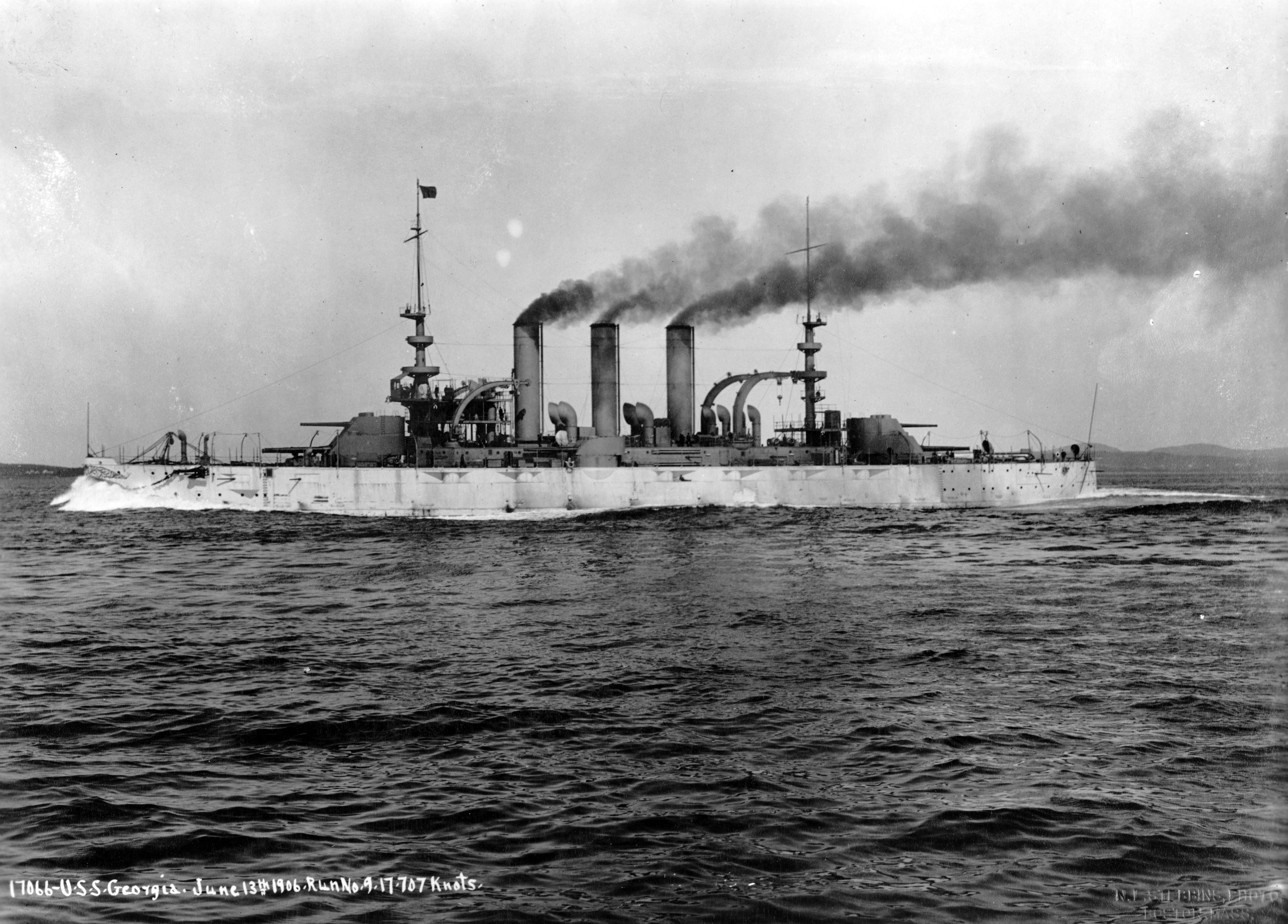
- USS Georgia running speed trials on 13 June 1906

History

United States
- Name: Georgia
- Namesake: Georgia
- Builder: Bath Iron Works
- Laid down: 31 August 1901
- Launched: 11 October 1904
- Commissioned: 24 September 1906
- Decommissioned: 15 July 1920
- Stricken: 10 November 1923
- Fate: Sold for scrap

General characteristics
- Class & type: Virginia-class battleship
- Displacement: Normal: 14,948 long tons (15,188 t); Full load: 16,094 long tons (16,352 t)
- Length: 441 ft 3 in (134 m)
- Beam: 76 ft 3 in (23 m)
- Draft: 23 ft 9 in (7 m)
- Installed power: 24 × Niclausse boilers; 19,000 ihp (14,000 kW)
- Propulsion: 2 × triple-expansion steam engines; 2 × screw propellers
- Speed: 19 kn (35 km/h; 22 mph)
- Complement: 812
- Armament: 4 × 12 in (305 mm)/40 caliber guns; 8 × 8 in (203 mm)/45 cal guns; 12 × 6 in (152 mm)/50 cal guns; 12 × 3 in (76 mm)/50 cal guns; 12 × 3-pounder guns; 4 × 21 inch (533 mm) torpedo tubes
- Armor: Belt: 6–11 in (152–279 mm); Barbettes: 10 in (254 mm); Turrets: 12 in (305 mm); Conning tower: 9 in (229 mm)

USS Georgia (hull number: BB-15) was a United States Navy Virginia-class battleship, the third of five ships of the class. She was built by the Bath Iron Works in Maine, with her keel laid in August 1901 and her launching in October 1904. The completed battleship was commissioned into the fleet in September 1906. The ship was armed with an offensive battery of four 12-inch (305 mm) guns and eight 8-inch (203 mm) guns, and she was capable of a top speed of 19 knots (35 km/h; 22 mph).

Georgia spent the majority of her career in the Atlantic Fleet. In 1907, she took part in the Jamestown Exposition and suffered an explosion in her aft 8-inch gun turret that killed or wounded 21 men. At the end of the year, she joined the Great White Fleet on its circumnavigation of the globe, which ended in early 1909. Peacetime training followed for the next five years, and in 1914 she cruised in Mexican waters to protect American interests during the Mexican Revolution. In early 1916, the ship was temporarily decommissioned.

When the United States entered World War I in April 1917, the ship was tasked with training naval recruits for the expanding wartime fleet. Starting in September 1918, she was used as a convoy escort. Her only casualties during the war were due to disease, the result of poor conditions and severe overcrowding aboard the ship. Georgia was used to transport American soldiers back from France in 1918–1919, and the following year she was transferred to the Pacific Fleet, where she served as the flagship of the 2nd Division, 1st Squadron. The Washington Naval Treaty, signed in 1922, cut short the ship's career, as it mandated severe draw-downs in naval strength. Georgia was accordingly sold for scrap in November 1923.

== Design ==
Design work on the Virginia class began in 1899, after the United States' victory in the Spanish–American War, which had demonstrated the need for sea-going battleships suitable for operations abroad, finally resolving the debate between proponents of that type and those who favored low-freeboard types useful for coastal defense. The designers included a superposed arrangement of the main and some of the secondary guns, which proved to be a significant disappointment in service, as firing either set of guns interfered with the others, slowing the rate of fire.

Plan and profile of the Virginia class

Georgia was 441 feet 3 inches (134.49 m) long overall and had a beam of 76 ft 3 in (23.24 m) and a draft of 23 ft 9 in (7.24 m). She displaced 14,948 long tons (15,188 t) as designed and up to 16,094 long tons (16,352 t) at full load. The ship was powered by two-shaft triple-expansion steam engines rated at 19,000 indicated horsepower (14,000 kW), with steam provided by twenty-four coal-fired Niclausse boilers. The propulsion system generated a top speed of 19 knots (35 km/h; 22 mph). As built, she was fitted with heavy military masts, but these were quickly replaced by cage masts in 1909. She had a crew of 812 officers and enlisted men.

The ship was armed with a main battery of four 12 in (305 mm) /40 caliber Mark 4 (Note: /40 refers to the length of the gun in terms of calibers. A /40 gun is 40 times long as it is in bore diameter.) guns in two twin gun turrets on the centerline, one forward and aft. The secondary battery consisted of eight 8 in (203 mm) /45 guns and twelve 6 in (152 mm) /50 caliber guns. The 8-inch guns were mounted in four twin turrets; two of these were superposed atop the main battery turrets, with the other two turrets abreast the forward funnel. The 6-inch guns were placed in casemates in the hull. For close-range defense against torpedo boats, she carried twelve 3-inch /50 guns mounted in casemates along the side of the hull and twelve 3-pounder guns. As was standard for capital ships of the period, Georgia carried four 21 inch (533 mm) torpedo tubes, submerged in her hull on the broadside.

Georgia's main armored belt was 11 in (279 mm) thick over the magazines and the machinery spaces and 6 in (152 mm) elsewhere. The faces of the main battery gun turrets (and the secondary turrets on top of them) were 12-inch (305 mm) thick. Each turret rested on a supporting barbettes that had 10 in (254 mm) of armor plating. The conning tower had 9 in (229 mm) thick sides.

== Service history ==
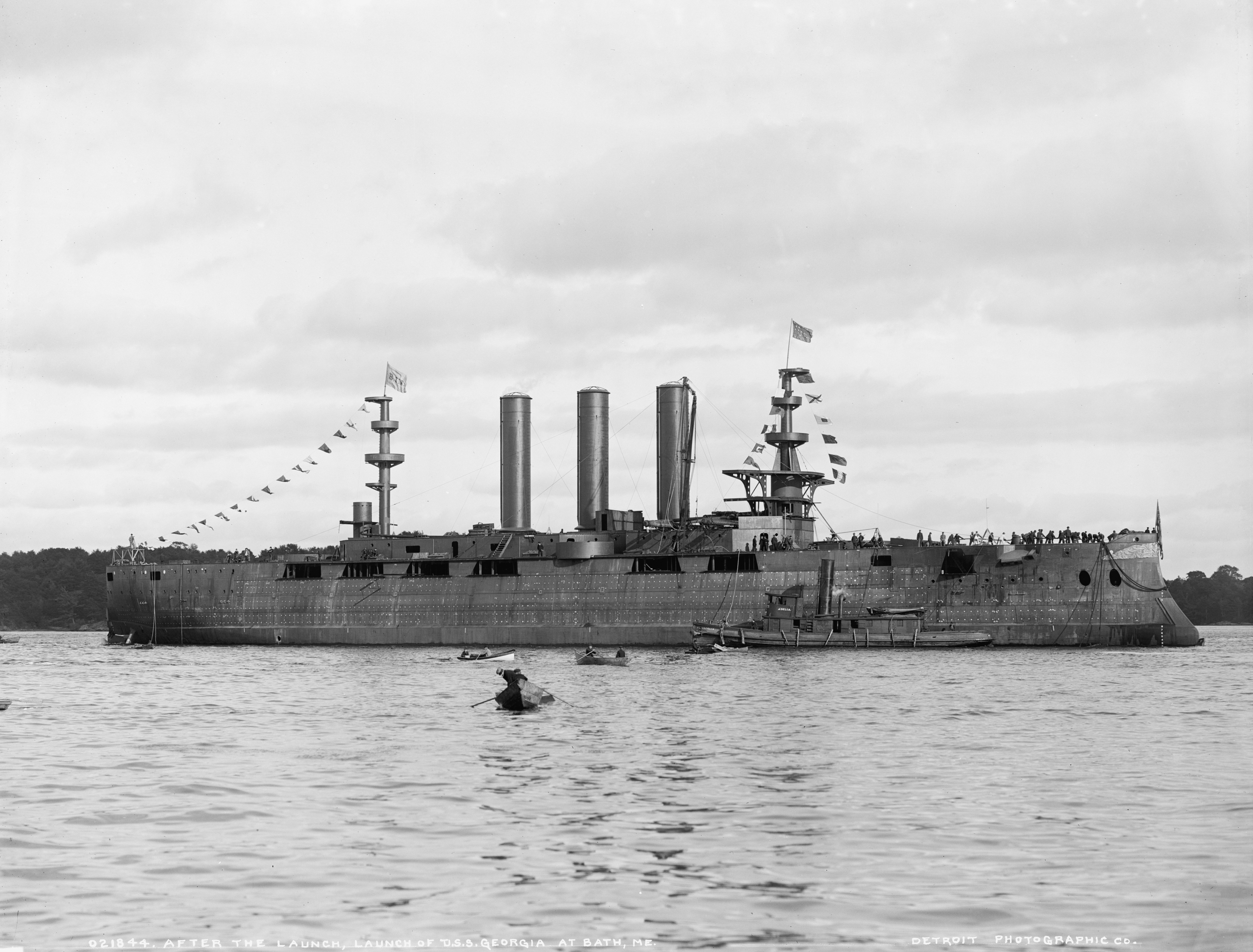
USS Georgia just after launch

=== Early career and the Great White Fleet ===
Georgia was laid down on 31 August 1901 at the Bath Iron Works in Maine. Her completed hull was launched on 11 October 1904, after which fitting-out work commenced. The ship was commissioned into the fleet on 24 September 1906. Georgia conducted a shakedown cruise after fitting-out work was completed, before joining the 2nd Division, 1 Squadron of the Atlantic Fleet. She steamed out of Hampton Roads on 26 March 1907 to join the rest of the fleet in Guantanamo Bay, Cuba; there, the ships conducted gunnery training. Georgia then steamed to the Boston Navy Yard for repairs before attending the Jamestown Exposition, which commemorated the 300th anniversary of the founding of the Jamestown colony. An international fleet that included British, French, German, Japanese, and Austro-Hungarian warships joined the US Navy at the event.

On 10 June, the ship took part in a naval review for President Theodore Roosevelt. Two days later, she departed for target practice in Cape Cod Bay, arriving on 15 June. A propellant charge exploded in her aft 8-inch turret on 15 July, killing ten officers and men and wounding another eleven. Later that year, the ship took part in fleet maneuvers in the Atlantic, and on 24 September she went into dry dock at the Philadelphia Naval Shipyard for an overhaul.

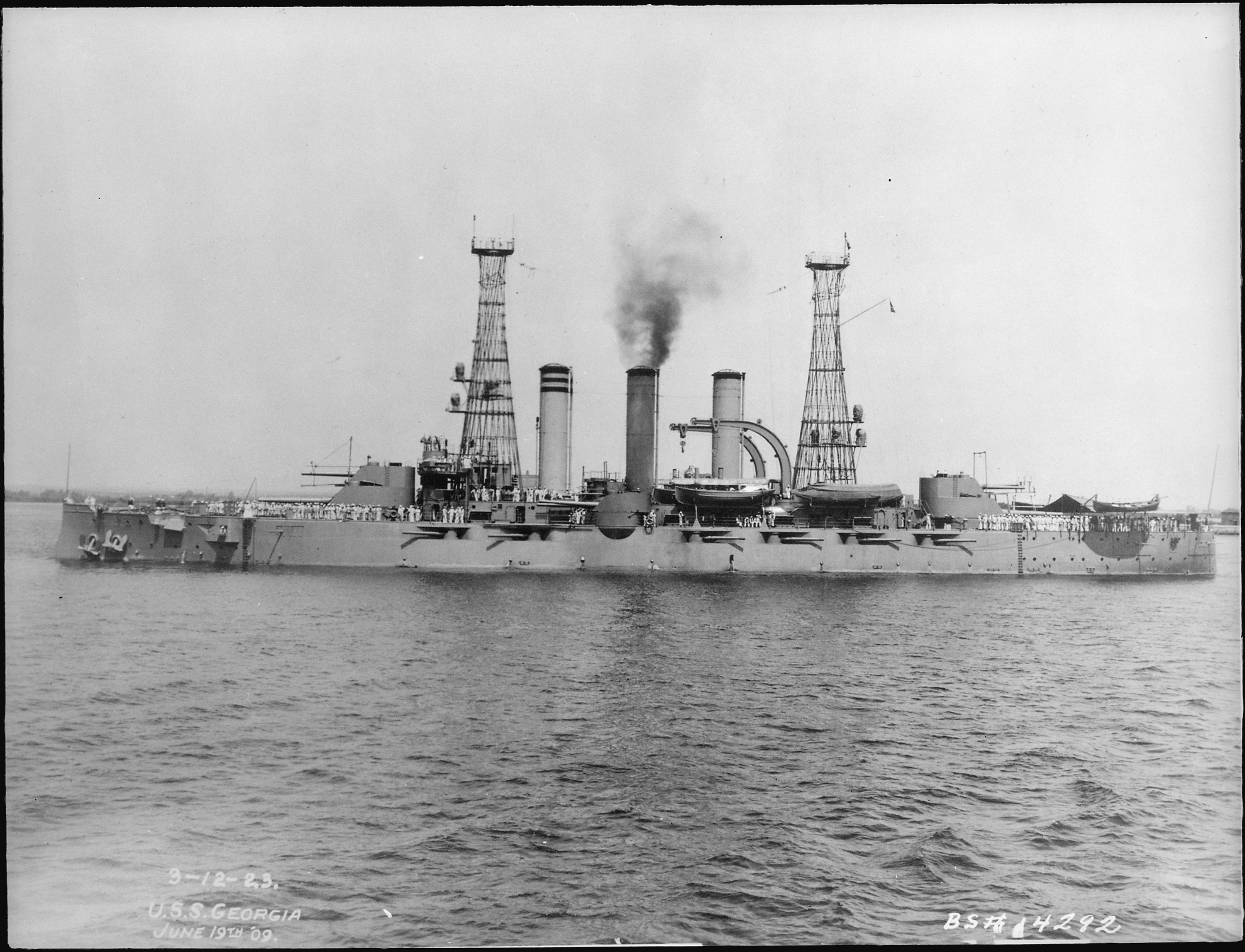
Georgia underway, 1909

Georgia joined the Great White Fleet on 16 December 1907, when they departed Hampton Roads to begin their circumnavigation of the globe. The cruise of the Great White Fleet was conceived as a way to demonstrate American military power, particularly to Japan. Tensions had begun to rise between the United States and Japan after the latter's victory in the Russo-Japanese War in 1905, particularly over racist opposition to Japanese immigration to the United States. The press in both countries began to call for war, and Roosevelt hoped to use the demonstration of naval might to deter Japanese aggression. The fleet cruised south to the Caribbean and then to South America, making stops in Port of Spain, Rio de Janeiro, Punta Arenas, and Valparaíso, among other cities. After arriving in Mexico in March 1908, the fleet spent three weeks conducting gunnery practice. The fleet then resumed its voyage up the Pacific coast of the Americas, stopping in San Francisco and Seattle before crossing the Pacific to Australia, stopping in Hawaii on the way. Stops in the South Pacific included Melbourne, Sydney, and Auckland.

After leaving Australia, the fleet turned north for the Philippines, stopping in Manila, before continuing on to Japan where a welcoming ceremony was held in Yokohama. Three weeks of exercises followed in Subic Bay in the Philippines in November. The ships passed Singapore on 6 December and entered the Indian Ocean; they coaled in Colombo before proceeding to the Suez Canal and coaling again at Port Said, Egypt. The fleet called in several Mediterranean ports before stopping in Gibraltar, where an international fleet of British, Russian, French, and Dutch warships greeted the Americans. The ships then crossed the Atlantic to return to Hampton Roads on 22 February 1909, having traveled 46,729 nautical miles (86,542 km; 53,775 mi). There, they conducted a naval review for Theodore Roosevelt.

=== 1910–1923 ===
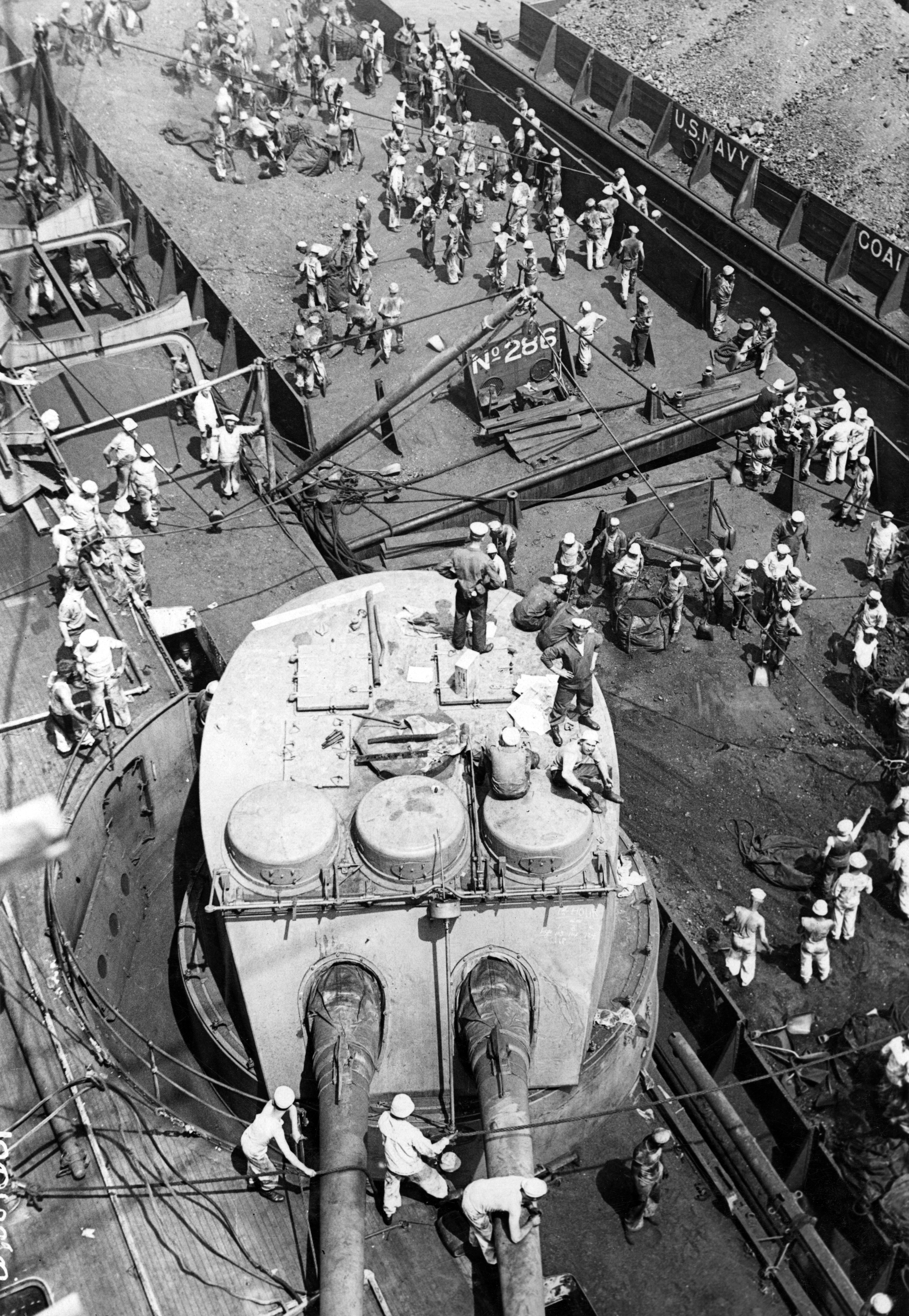
Georgia's crew coaling the ship, c. 1919, as seen from the foremast

Over the course of the following year and a half, Georgia conducted a peacetime routine of training maneuvers and gunnery drills. On 2 November 1910, she took part in a naval review for President William Howard Taft in preparation for a cruise to western Europe with the Atlantic Fleet. The ships stopped in France and Britain, and conducted extensive maneuvers while on the cruise. Georgia and the rest of the fleet arrived back in Guantanamo Bay on 13 March 1911. She returned to her peacetime training routine for the next two years. On 5 June 1913, she conducted a training cruise for midshipmen from the United States Naval Academy, followed by an overhaul in the Boston Navy Yard. In early January, she was deployed to Mexican waters to protect American interests in the country during the Mexican Revolution. She remained there from 14 January 1914 to March, when she returned to Norfolk briefly. The ship was back cruising off Mexico during the summer, and from August to October she operated in Haitian waters to protect Americans in the country, which was also experiencing internal unrest.

The ship then went into drydock for an overhaul, before returning to Cuban waters for maneuvers with the fleet. She arrived there on 25 February 1915. The rest of the year was spent with training exercises with the Atlantic Fleet. Another overhaul, at the Boston Navy Yard, from 20 January to January 1916. On 27 January, Georgia was decommissioned temporarily. The same day as the United States' declaration of war against Germany on 6 April 1917, the ship was reactivated for service during World War I. She was assigned to the 3rd Division, Battleship Force, based in the York River, Virginia. She spent most of the war training gunners for the rapidly expanding wartime Navy and conducting tactical training exercises. During this period, the ship frequently had more than a thousand men aboard the ship, despite the fact that she had sleeping accommodations for only 750. The ship's commander at the time, Captain Sumner Kittelle, raised concerns about the over-crowded conditions aboard the ship.

From September 1918 to the end of the conflict, Georgia was assigned to the Cruiser Force Atlantic as a convoy escort. The ship's first operation was with troop ship convoy 67, which departed New York on 23 September; the rest of the escort consisted of the armored cruisers North Carolina and Montana and the destroyer Rathburne. Georgia had to take on 525 long tons (533 t) of coal in addition to her normal stocks, which significantly degraded her seakeeping characteristics. The ship accordingly had to be battened down to reduce flooding from heavy seas, which had the effect of hastening the spread of disease. During the cruise, the crew suffered from 120 cases of influenza and 14 cases of pneumonia; 7 men died from disease. Even with the additional coal, the ship did not have sufficient fuel to reach the hand off point and she had to break off from the convoy to return to port. Germany signed an Armistice with the Allied powers, ending the war on 11 November. On 10 December, the ship was equipped to serve as a transport to carry American soldiers back from France. This duty saw the ship transferred to the Cruiser and Transport Force. She made five trips between December 1918 and June 1919, carrying almost 6,000 soldiers in total. The first trip, made in company with the battleship Kansas, arrived in Brest, France on 22 December 1918.

Georgia was transferred to the Pacific Fleet shortly thereafter, departing from Boston on 16 July 1919. She transited the Panama Canal and arrived in San Diego, where she became the flagship of the 2nd Division, 1st Squadron. The ship went to the Mare Island Navy Yard for periodic maintenance on 20 September. The ship remained there until 15 July 1920 when she was decommissioned. Under the terms of the 1922 Washington Naval Treaty, the ship was sold for scrapping on 1 November 1923 and subsequently was broken up. The ship was formally stricken from the Navy Directory on 10 November. The ship's bell and an eagle figurehead are preserved at the Reserve Officers Training Corps at the Georgia Institute of Technology.
