= Georgia =

Georgia most commonly refers to:

- Georgia (country), in the South Caucasus
- Georgia (U.S. state), a state in the Southeastern US

Georgia may also refer to:

== People and fictional characters ==
- Georgia (name), a list of people and fictional characters with the female given name
- Georgia (musician) (born 1990), English singer, songwriter, and drummer Georgia Barnes

== Places ==
=== Historical polities in Caucasus ===
- Kingdom of Georgia, a medieval kingdom
- Kingdom of Eastern Georgia, a late medieval kingdom
- Kingdom of Western Georgia, a late medieval kingdom
- Georgia Governorate, a subdivision of the Russian Empire
- Georgia within the Russian Empire
- Democratic Republic of Georgia, a country established after the collapse of the Russian Empire and later conquered by Soviet Russia
- Georgian Soviet Socialist Republic, a republic within the Soviet Union
- Republic of Georgia (1990–1992), a republic in the Soviet Union which, after the collapse of the USSR (1991), was an independent country

=== Historical polities in North America ===
- Province of Georgia, one of the thirteen American colonies in what became the United States

=== Canada ===
- Georgia Street, in Vancouver, British Columbia, Canada
- Strait of Georgia, British Columbia, Canada

=== United Kingdom ===
- Georgia, Cornwall, England, UK
- South Georgia and the South Sandwich Islands

=== United States ===
- Georgia, Indiana
- Georgia, New Jersey
- Georgia, Vermont
- Georgia Avenue, Washington, DC

=== Other places ===
- 359 Georgia, an asteroid

== Arts and entertainment ==
=== Films ===
- Georgia (1988 film), an Australian thriller
- Georgia (1995 film), an American drama

=== Albums ===
- Georgia, by Georgia, 2015
- Georgia (EP), by Brian Fallon, or the title song, 2016
- Georgia, the second part of Macon, Georgia by Jason Aldean, 2022

=== Songs ===
- "Georgia", by Boz Scaggs from Silk Degrees, 1976
- "Georgia", by Elton John from A Single Man, 1978
- "Georgia", by Orchestral Manoeuvres in the Dark from Architecture & Morality, 1981
- "Georgia" (Carolyn Dawn Johnson song), 2000
- "Georgia" (Field Mob and Ludacris song), 2005
- "Georgia", by Hanson from The Walk, 2007
- "Georgia" (Cee Lo Green song), 2010
- "Georgia" (Vance Joy song), 2014
- "Georgia", by Phoebe Bridgers from Stranger in the Alps, 2017
- "Georgia", by Brittany Howard from Jaime, 2019
- "Georgia", by Kevin Abstract from Arizona Baby, 2019

== Ships ==
- CSS Georgia (1862), merchant ship completed in 1862 and commissioned as a warship in 1863
- CSS Georgia (1863), floating battery commissioned in 1863
- SS Georgia (1890), a cargo ship completed in 1891 and renamed Georgia in 1894
- SS Georgia (1908), an oil tanker completed in 1908 and renamed Georgia in 1917
- USS Georgia (BB-15), a battleship commissioned in 1906
- USS Georgia (SSGN-729), a submarine commissioned in 1984

== Universities ==
- University of Georgia, in Athens, Georgia, US
  - Georgia Bulldogs, the athletic teams of the University of Georgia
- University of Georgia (Tbilisi), in Tbilisi, Georgia

== Other uses ==
- Georgia (coffee), a brand of coffee beverages (often flavored) sold by The Coca-Cola Company
- Georgia (typeface), a Microsoft font family
- "Georgia", a national sports team for the country of Georgia; see Category:National sports teams of Georgia (country)
  - Georgia national football team
- Typhoon Georgia (1959)

== See also ==
- Republic of Georgia (disambiguation)
- State of Georgia (disambiguation)
- Georgia state (disambiguation)
- George (disambiguation)
- Georgian (disambiguation)
- Giorgia (disambiguation)
- Georgea Regout, Belgian actor
