= USS Pennsylvania (ACR-4) =

Lead ship of a class of armored cruisers

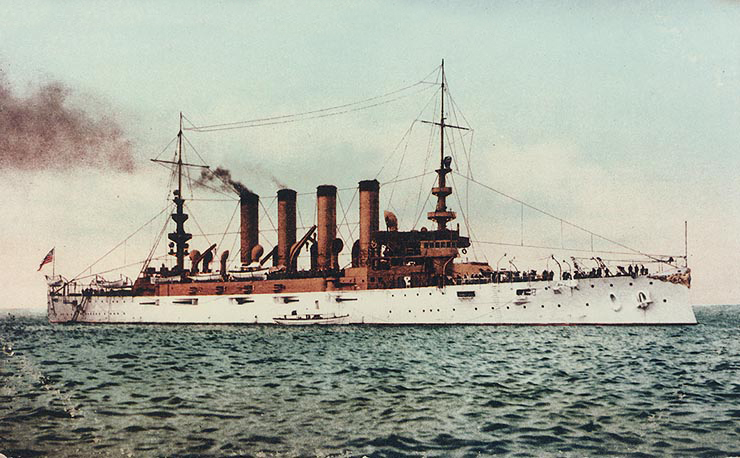
- Tinted postcard of USS Pennsylvania, from around 1905–1908.

History

United States
- Name: Nebraska (1900–1901); Pennsylvania (1901–1912); Pittsburgh (1912–1931)
- Namesake: Commonwealth of Pennsylvania; City of Pittsburgh, Pennsylvania
- Ordered: 3 March 1899
- Awarded: 10 January 1901
- Builder: William Cramp & Sons, Philadelphia, Pennsylvania
- Cost: $3,890,000 (contract price of hull and machinery)
- Yard number: 317
- Laid down: 7 August 1901
- Launched: 22 August 1903
- Sponsored by: Miss Coral Quay
- Commissioned: 9 March 1905
- Renamed: Pennsylvania, 7 March 1901; Pittsburgh, 27 August 1912
- Reclassified: CA-4, 17 July 1920
- Decommissioned: 15 October 1921
- Recommissioned: 2 October 1922
- Decommissioned: 10 July 1931
- Stricken: 26 October 1931
- Identification: Hull symbol: ACR-4 (1905–1920)–; Hull symbol: CA-4 (1920–1931)
- Fate: Sold for scrap 21 December 1931

General characteristics (as built)
- Class & type: Pennsylvania-class armored cruiser
- Displacement: 13,680 long tons (13,900 t) (standard)
- Length: 504 ft (154 m) oa; 502 ft (153 m) pp
- Beam: 69 ft 6 in (21.18 m)
- Draft: 24 ft 1 in (7.34 m) (mean)
- Installed power: 32 × Niclausse boilers; 23,000 ihp (17,000 kW)
- Propulsion: 2 × vertical triple expansion reciprocating engines; 2 × screws
- Speed: 22 kn (41 km/h; 25 mph); 22.44 kn (41.56 km/h; 25.82 mph) (Speed on Trial)
- Complement: 80 officers 745 enlisted 64 Marines
- Armament: 4 × 8 in (203 mm)/40 caliber Mark 5 breech-loading rifles (BL)(2×2); 14 × 6 in (152 mm)/50 cal Mark 6 BL rifles; 18 × 3 in (76 mm)/50 cal rapid-fire guns; 12 × 3-pounder (47 mm (1.9 in)) Driggs-Schroeder guns; 2 × 1-pounder (37 mm (1.5 in)) Driggs-Schroeder saluting guns; 2 × 18 inch (450 mm) torpedo tubes
- Armor: Belt: 6 in (152 mm) (top & waterline); 5 in (127 mm) (bottom); Deck: 1 1/2 in (38 mm) - 6 in (amidships); 4 in (102 mm) (forward & aft); Barbettes: 6 in; Turrets: 6 - 6 1/2 in (165 mm); Conning Tower: 9 in (229 mm)

General characteristics (Pre-1911 Refit)
- Installed power: 8 × Modified Niclausse boilers, 12 × Babcock & Wilcox boilers
- Armament: 4 × 8 in/45 cal Mark 6 BL rifles (2×2); 14 × 6 in/50 cal Mark 6 BL rifles; 18 × 3 in/50 cal rapid-fire guns; 4 × 3-pounder (47 mm) Driggs-Schroeder saluting guns; 2 × 18 in torpedo tubes

General characteristics (Pre-1921 Refit)
- Armament: 4 × 8 in/45 cal Mark 6 BL rifles (2×2); 14 × 6 in/50 cal Mark 6 BL rifles; 10 × 3 in/50 cal rapid-fire guns; 2 × 3 in/50 caliber anti-aircraft guns; 4 × 3-pounder (47 mm) Driggs-Schroeder saluting guns; 2 × 18 in torpedo tubes

The second USS Pennsylvania (ACR/CA-4), also referred to as Armored Cruiser No. 4, and later renamed Pittsburgh, was a United States Navy armored cruiser, the lead ship of her class. She was originally assigned the name Nebraska but was renamed Pennsylvania on 7 March 1901.

== Construction ==
Pennsylvania was laid down on 7 August 1901, by William Cramp & Sons of Philadelphia, Pennsylvania, and launched on 22 August 1903, sponsored by Miss Coral Quay, daughter of Senator Matthew S. Quay of Pennsylvania. Pennsylvania was commissioned on 9 March 1905 with Captain Thomas C. McLean in command.

== Service history ==
=== Pre-World War I ===
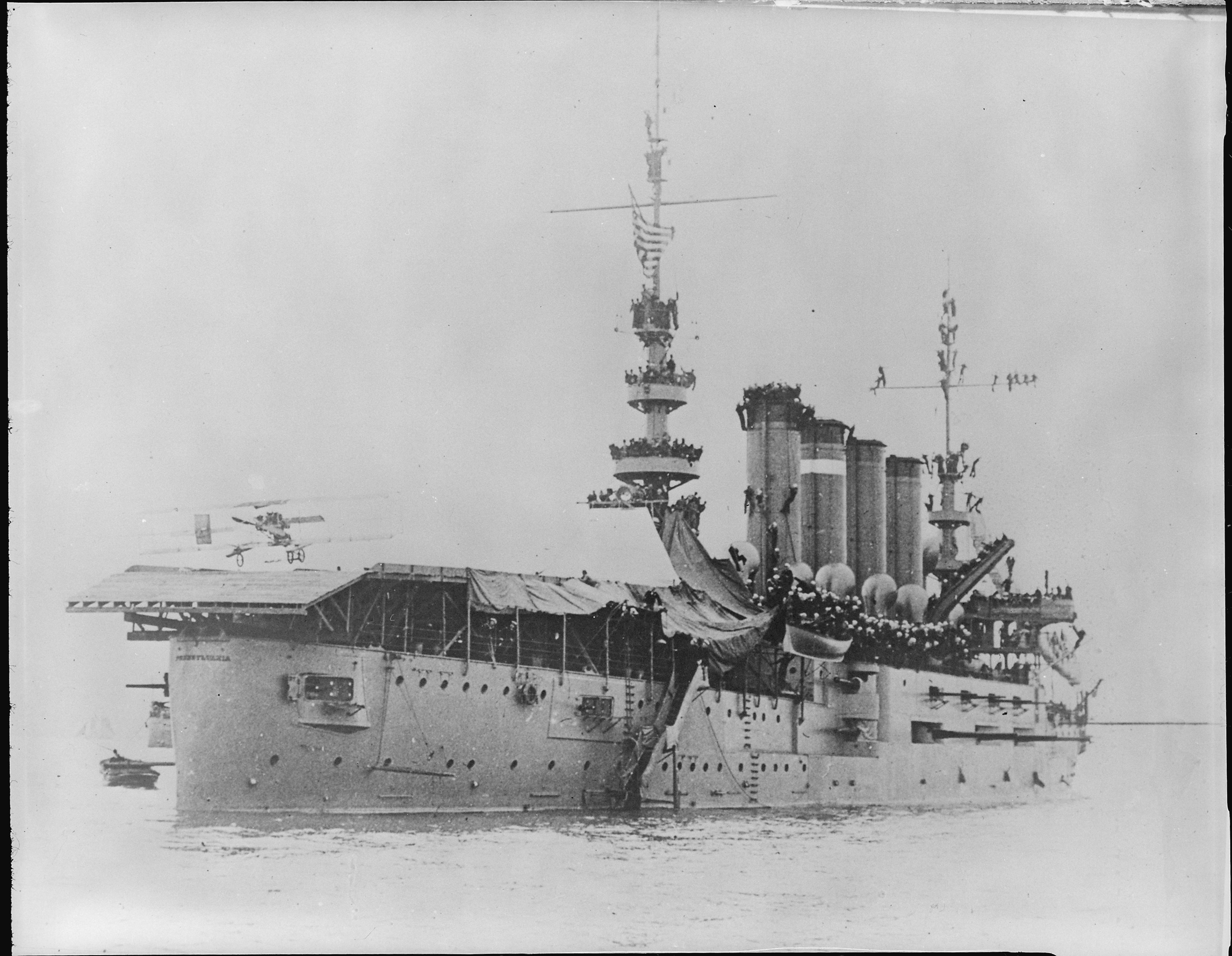
First fixed-wing aircraft landing on a warship: Eugene Ely landing his plane aboard Pennsylvania in San Francisco Bay on 18 January 1911.

Pennsylvania operated on the east coast of the United States and in the Caribbean Sea until 8 September 1906, when she cleared Newport for the Asiatic Station, returning to San Francisco on 27 September 1907, for United States West Coast duty. She visited Chile and Peru in 1910.

At 10:48 on 18 January 1911, Eugene Ely took off in a Curtiss Model D from Tanforan Racetrack in San Bruno, California, and at 11:01 he landed aboard Pennsylvania while she lay at anchor off Hunters Point in San Francisco Bay. The plane made a smooth landing from astern onto a specially built 130-by-32-foot (39.6 by 9.8 m) platform. At 11:58, Ely took off and returned to Selfridge Field, completing the earliest demonstration of the adaptability of aircraft to shipboard operations.

In another of these early demonstrations, civilian aircraft designer and entrepreneur Glenn Curtiss taxied a hydroaeroplane alongside Pennsylvania as she lay anchored in San Diego Harbor during the forenoon watch on 17 February 1911. The plane landed alongside the ship at 08:45 and sailors manned the cruiser's crane to hoist it aboard. At 09:05, Pennsylvania hoisted the aircraft back out onto the water and it returned to base.

While in reserve in Puget Sound from 1 July 1911 to 30 May 1913, the cruiser trained naval militia. She was renamed Pittsburgh on 27 August 1912 to free the name Pennsylvania for the new battleship USS Pennsylvania.

=== World War I ===
Recommissioning, Pittsburgh patrolled the west coast of Mexico, during the troubled times of insurrection that led to American involvement with the Veracruz landing in April 1914. Later she served as flagship for Admiral William B. Caperton—Commander in Chief, United States Pacific Fleet—during South American patrols and visits during World War I. Cooperating with the British, she scouted German raiders and acted as a powerful deterrent against their penetration of the eastern Pacific. Future Rear Admiral Ellis M. Zacharias served as a line officer aboard Pittsburgh during World War I.

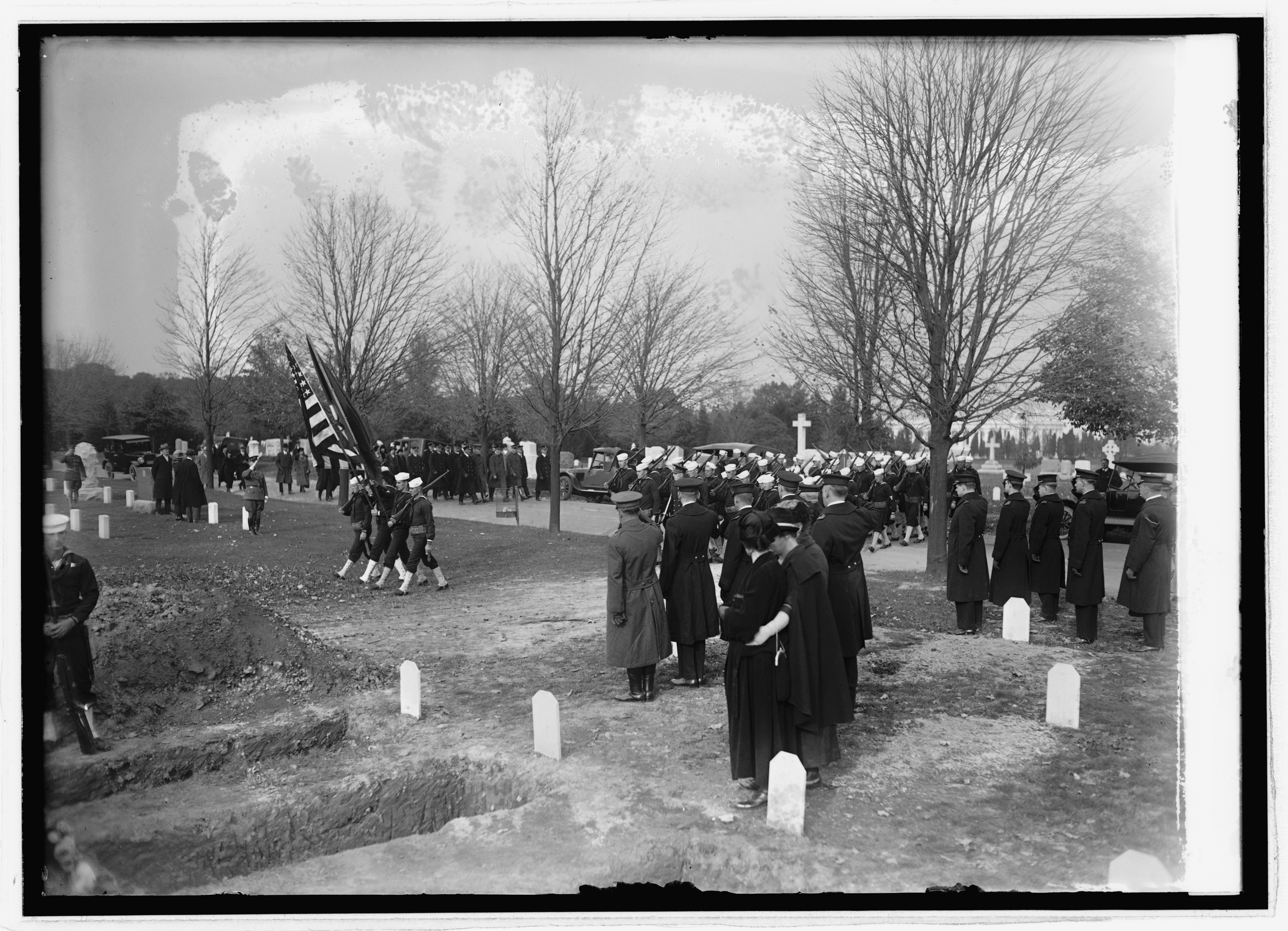
Twenty-three of the 58 victims of the 1918 influenza outbreak aboard the USS Pittsburgh were buried at Arlington National Cemetery on November 2, 1923.

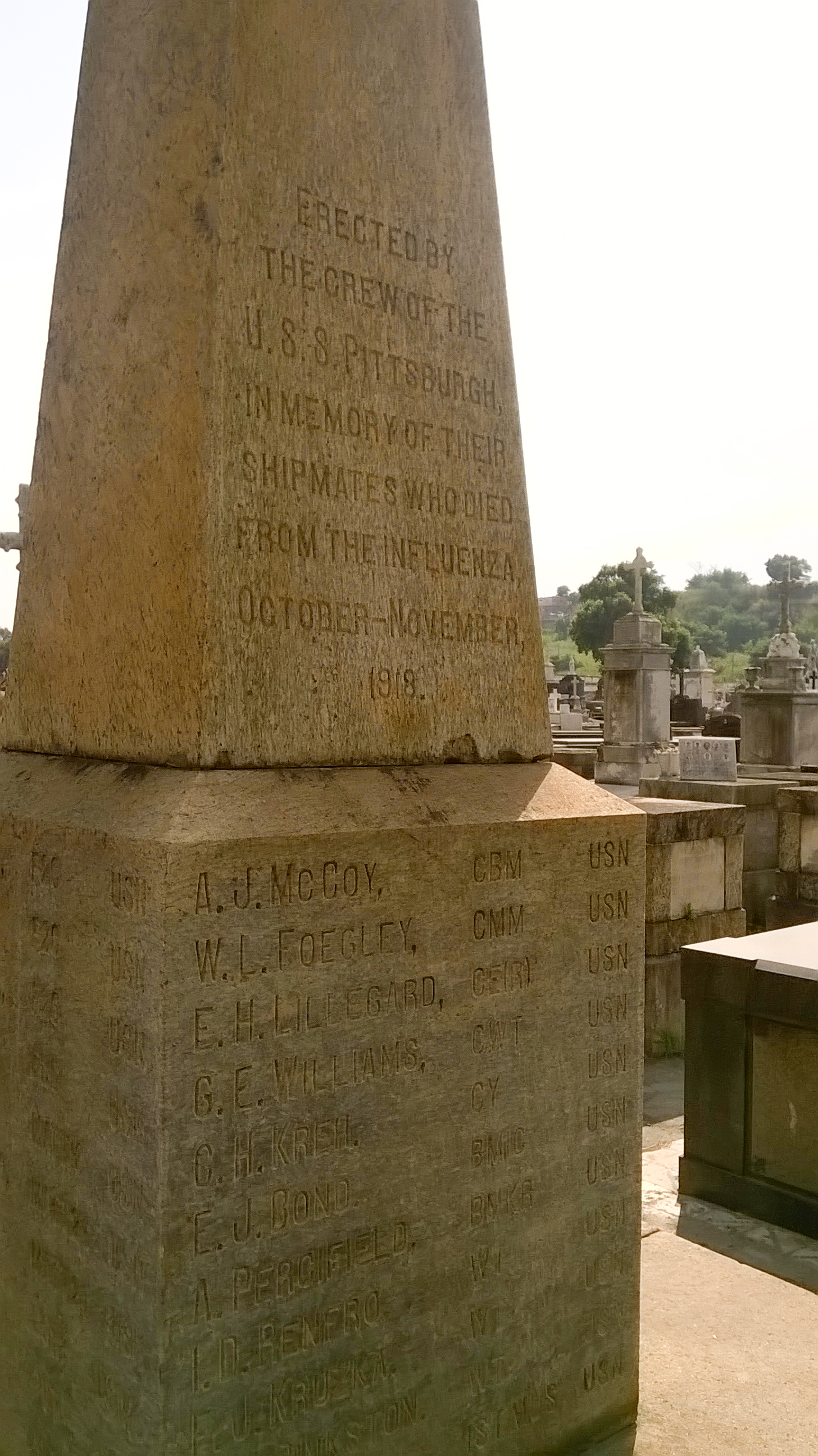
Memorial at São Francisco Xavier Cemetery in Rio de Janeiro, where the influenza victims were first buried

While at Rio de Janeiro, in October and November 1918, failure to implement quarantine procedures by Captain George Bradshaw, led to the spread of the deadly strain of Spanish influenza on ship, sickening 663 sailors (80% of the crew) and killing 58 of them.

=== Inter-war period ===
Returning to the United States East Coast, Pittsburgh prepared for duty as flagship for Commander, US Naval Forces in the eastern Mediterranean, for which she departed from Portsmouth, New Hampshire, on 19 June 1919. Cruising the Adriatic Sea, Aegean Sea, and Black Sea, she joined in the massive relief operations and other humanitarian concerns with which the Navy carried out its quasi-diplomatic functions in this troubled area. In June 1920, she steamed north to visit French and British ports and cruise the Baltic Sea on further relief assignments.

On 9 September 1920, Pittsburgh ran aground on rocks in the Baltic Sea off Libau. She was assisted by HMS Dauntless and Frederick; Frederick escorted her to Sheerness Royal Dockyard, Kent, England which she reached at 10:00 o'clock in the morning of 23 September. Before 12 October she had moved up river to Chatham Dockyard where she went into dry dock. On that date a team from Pittsburgh routed a team of British officers 21–8 at baseball. The following month, with Pittsburgh still in dry dock, a court-martial absolved Captain Todd of blame for the grounding but the navigator and watch officer were held accountable. She returned to decommission at Philadelphia, on 15 October 1921.

Recommissioned on 2 October 1922, Pittsburgh returned to European and Mediterranean waters as flagship of Naval Forces Europe, arriving in Gibraltar on 19 October. On 23 October, she hoisted the flag of Vice Admiral Long when Utah returned to the US. By 10 July 1923, Pittsburgh was in the harbor at Cherbourg, France, to disembark 3 officers and 60 enlisted men of her Marine Detachment. They were detailed to travel to the dedication of the Belleau Wood National Monument to the American Expeditionary Force. The Battle of Belleau Wood was where the US Marine Corps made a famous stand during the Allied Campaign of 1918. In 1923, when docked in Amsterdam, the crew of Pittsburgh took part in another baseball game, this time against a team of Dutch players. The details of the game are not known, but it is known that Pittsburgh team won. It would be the first of several games Dutch players would play with US Navy crews. Pittsburgh became flagship for two of the Commanders-in-Chief, US Naval Forces European Waters, Admiral Philip Andrews in 1924–1925 and Vice Admiral Roger Welles in 1925–1926.

The ship arrived at New York on 17 July 1926, to prepare for flagship duty with the Asiatic Fleet, during which time she was partially refitted, including the removal of her forward stack (making her unique to her class) and removal and plating over several 3-inch guns. She sailed on 16 October, for Yantai, arriving on 23 December. Early in January 1927, she landed sailors and Marines to protect Americans and other foreigners in Shanghai, from the turmoil and fighting of the Chinese power struggle. When Chiang Kai-shek's National Revolutionary Army won control of Shanghai, in March 1927, Pittsburgh resumed patrol operations and exercises with the Asiatic Fleet. Future Governor of American Samoa George Landenberger commanded the vessel in 1930. Closing her long career of service, she carried the Governor General of the Philippines, Dwight F. Davis, on a courtesy cruise to such ports as Saigon, Bangkok, Singapore, Belawan, Batavia (Jakarta), Surabaya, Bali, Makassar, and Sandakan, returning to Manila, on 15 April 1931. Six days later, she steamed for Suez, en route to Hampton Roads, arriving on 26 June. She was decommissioned on 10 July, and under the terms of the London Naval Treaty, sold for scrapping to Union Shipbuilding, Baltimore, Maryland on 21 December.

== Bow ornament ==
Pittsburgh's bow ornament was presented to the Carnegie Institute of Technology in Pittsburgh, Pennsylvania, where it was installed overlooking Junction Hollow at the western edge of the school's campus. Today, the ornament is on display at Soldiers and Sailors National Military Museum and Memorial; a replica of it is still in place at the modern Carnegie Mellon University.

== Memorial bell ==
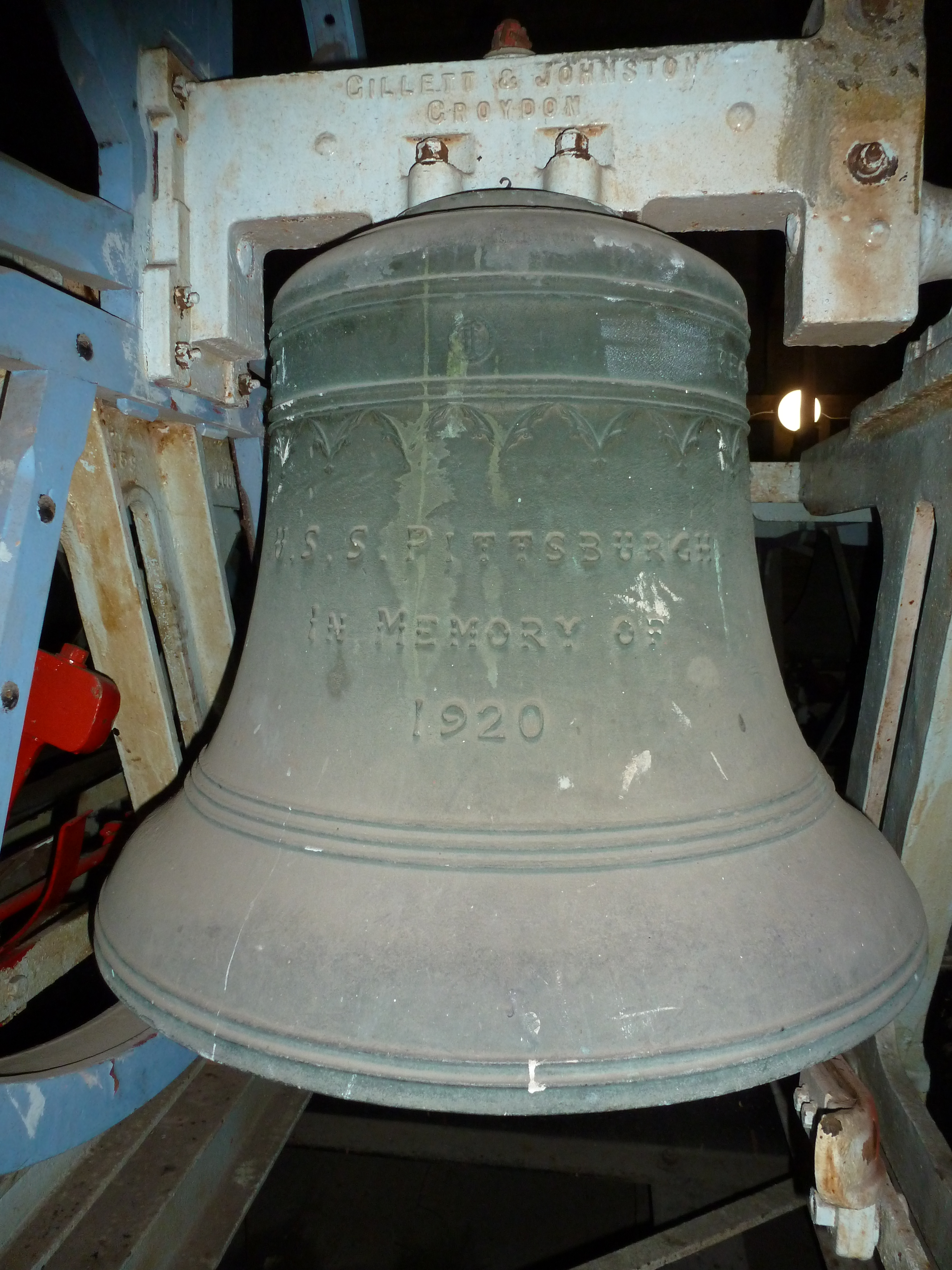
The number 3 bell showing the dedication to USS Pittsburgh. The bell's diameter is 30 inches (76 cm).

The number 3 bell at Rochester Cathedral, England, bears the inscription "U.S.S. PITTSBURGH IN MEMORY OF 1920". For many years the reason for this inscription was a mystery. Then a researcher found the explanation in the Chatham News of 17 December 1920. That issue included a letter from Captain J. W. Todd, who commanded Pittsburgh in 1920. Todd thanked the dean of the cathedral for various hospitality events during the two and a half months that Pittsburgh was in dry dock at Chatham. He enclosed a cheque for £52 10s to pay for the recasting of the bell and suggested the inscription.
