= Pennsylvania-class cruiser =

Class of American naval ships

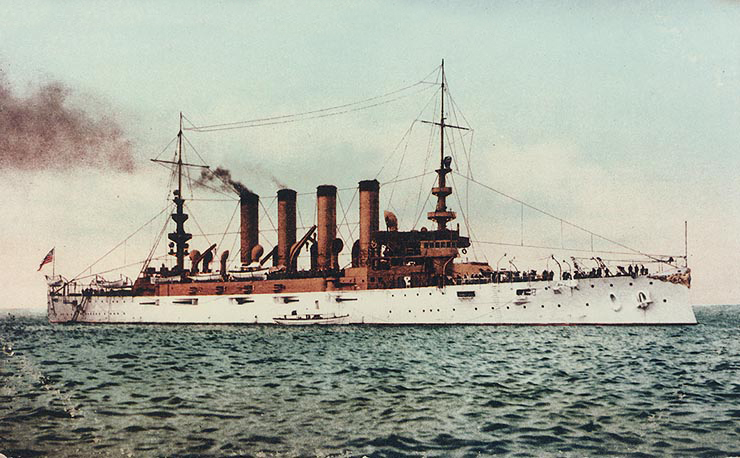
- Color-tinted postcard of USS Pennsylvania, circa 1905–1908

Class overview
- Name: Pennsylvania class
- Builders: William Cramp & Sons, PA (2); Newport News Shipbuilding, VA (2); Union Iron Works, CA (2)
- Operators: United States Navy
- Preceded by: USS Brooklyn (ACR-3)
- Succeeded by: Tennessee class
- Built: 1901–1908
- In commission: 1905–1927
- Completed: 6
- Active: 0
- Lost: 1
- Scrapped: 5

General characteristics (as built)
- Type: Armored cruiser
- Displacement: 13,680 long tons (13,900 t) (standard); 15,138 long tons (15,381 t) (full load)
- Length: 504 ft (153.6 m)
- Beam: 69 ft 6 in (21.2 m)
- Draft: 26 ft 1 in (7.95 m)
- Installed power: 16 × Babcock & Wilcox boilers (32 × Niclausse boilers in Pennsylvania and Colorado); 23,000 ihp (17,000 kW) (design)
- Propulsion: 2 × vertical, inverted, triple-expansion engines; 2 × screws
- Speed: 22 kn (41 km/h; 25 mph)
- Complement: 830
- Armament: 4 × 8 in (203 mm)/40 caliber Mark 5 guns (2 × 2); 14 × 6 in (152 mm)/50 cal Mark 6 guns; 18 × 3 in (76 mm)/50 cal rapid fire (RF) guns; 12 × 3-pounder (47 mm (1.9 in)) RF guns; 2 × 1-pounder (37 mm (1.5 in)) saluting guns; 2 × 18 inch (450 mm) torpedo tubes
- Armor: Belt: 6–5 in (152–127 mm); Turrets: 6.5 in (165 mm); Deck: 4 in (102 mm) slope, 1.5 in (38 mm) flat; Conning Tower: 9 in (229 mm)

General characteristics (1911)
- Armament: 4 × 8 in/45 cal Mark 6 guns (2 × 2), remainder of armament unchanged

General characteristics (1919)
- Armament: 4 × 8 in/45 caliber Mark 6 guns (2 × 2); 4 × 6 in/50 caliber Mark 6 guns; 10 × 3 in/50 caliber RF guns; 2 × 3 in/50 caliber anti-aircraft guns; All 3-pounder guns removed

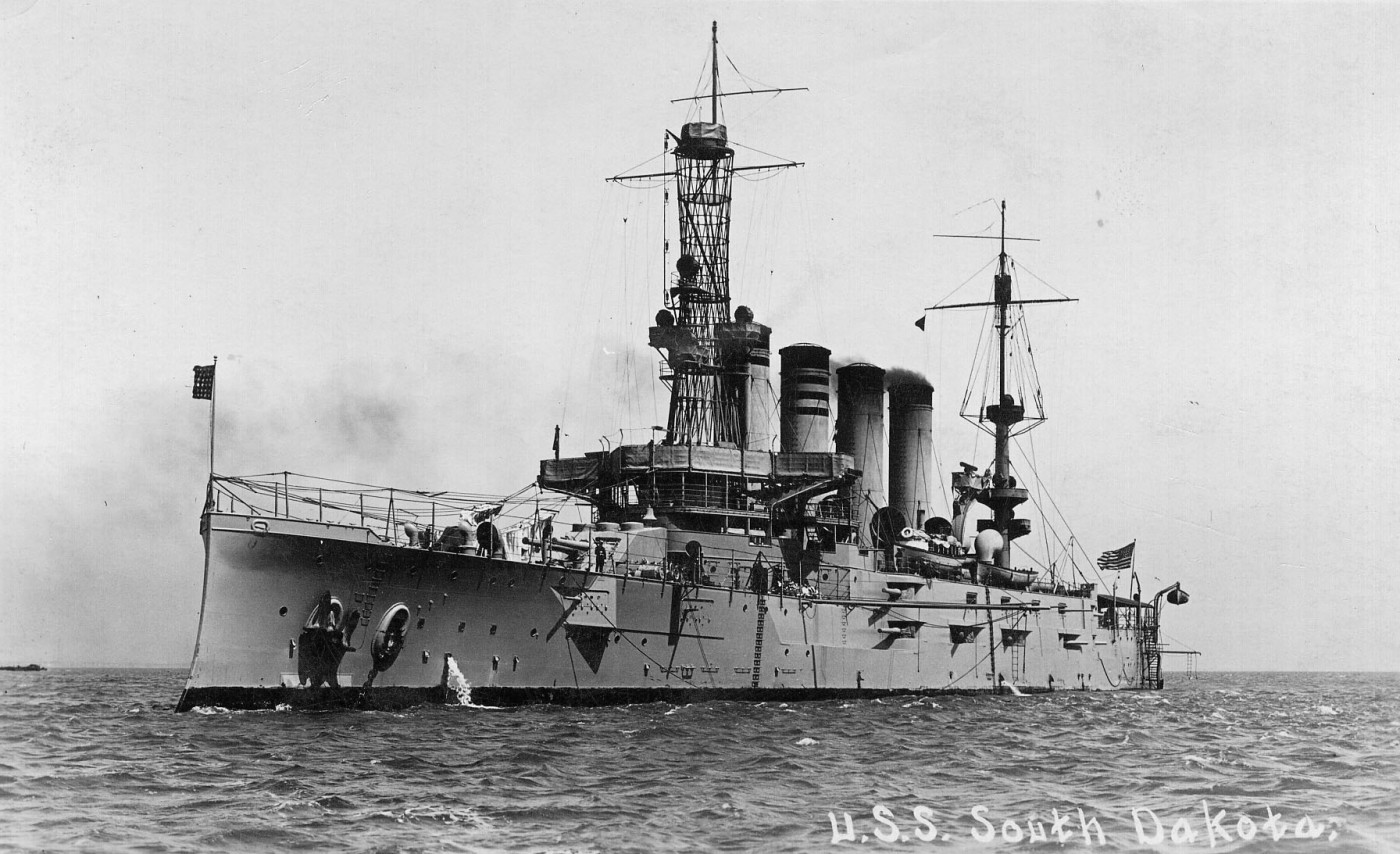
USS South Dakota with a cage foremast, circa 1911–1916

The Pennsylvania class of six armored cruisers served in the United States Navy from 1905 to 1927. All six were renamed for cities 1912–1920, to make the state names available for the new battleships beginning with the Pennsylvania-class battleships. All of these served during World War I, with California (then San Diego) being the only ship of the class to be lost. The remaining five armored cruisers were scrapped in 1930 and 1931 in accordance with the London Naval Treaty.

== Design and construction ==
These ships were ordered in fiscal years 1900 (ACR-4 to ACR-6) and 1901 (ACR-7 to ACR-9) as part of the naval buildup touched off by the Spanish–American War. Together with the four immediately succeeding Tennessee-class ships they were called the "Big Ten". They were originally intended to operate in the battle line with battleships. However, their role was changing even as they entered service. The 1904 report of the Navy's Bureau of Navigation, examining the results of the Russo-Japanese War, noted that "...the work of the armored cruisers was auxiliary to that of the battleships..." and "They can serve with battleships, but they can never take their place". In 1906 the US Navy's battleships were concentrated in the Atlantic, and three or four armored cruisers were assigned to the Asiatic Fleet in the Philippines to counter Japan's rising naval power. By 1912 the rapid development of dreadnought battleships and battlecruisers left the armored cruisers unable to successfully engage the newer capital ships.

=== Armament ===
These ships were originally armed with four 8-inch (203 mm)/40 caliber Mark 5 guns in two twin turrets fore and aft. However, these were replaced with 8-inch/45 caliber Mark 6 guns by 1911 as a result of a gun bursting on Colorado in 1907. Fourteen 6-inch (152 mm)/50 caliber Mark 6 guns were mounted in casemates on the sides. The large secondary armament, intended to combat torpedo boats, included eighteen 3-inch (76 mm)/50 caliber rapid fire (RF) guns and twelve 3-pounder (47 mm (1.9 in)) RF guns. Two 1-pounder (37 mm (1.5 in)) saluting guns and two 18-inch (457 mm) torpedo tubes were also carried.

=== Armor ===
In the development of these ships Captain Sigsbee, formerly of the ill-fated Maine, successfully argued for adequate armor protection at the expense of speed. The belt armor was 6 in (152 mm) at the waterline with a 5 in (127 mm) upper belt, but was only 3.5 in (89 mm) at the ends. The turrets had up to 6.5 in (165 mm) on the faces. The protective deck had 4 in (102 mm) on the sloped sides and 1.5 in (38 mm) in the flat middle. The conning tower was 9 in (229 mm) thick.

=== Engineering ===
The engineering plant included 16 coal-fired Babcock & Wilcox boilers (32 Niclausse boilers in the Cramp-built Pennsylvania and Colorado) supplying 250 psi (1,700 kPa) steam to two inverted vertical four-cylinder triple-expansion engines, totaling 23,000 ihp (17,000 kW) for 22 kn (41 km/h; 25 mph) as designed. On trials South Dakota achieved 22.24 kn (41.19 km/h; 25.59 mph) at 28,543 ihp (21,285 kW). The normal coal allowance was 900 tons, but this could be increased to 2,000 tons.

=== Refits ===
In 1909–1911 the ships' original 8-inch/40 caliber guns were replaced with four 8-inch (203 mm)/45 caliber Mark 6 guns in Mark 12 turrets due to a gun bursting on Colorado in 1907. From 1911 the military foremasts were replaced with cage masts. In 1911, Pennsylvania was fitted with an after flight deck for the first landing on a ship by an aircraft. This was a one-off demonstration on 18 January 1911 with pilot Eugene Ely, who had performed the first takeoff from a ship on USS Birmingham (CL-2) two months earlier. From 1915 to the American entry into World War I in April 1917, Huntington and two Tennessee-class ships had catapults for seaplanes (which disabled the after turret) and carried up to four aircraft; Huntington could also tether an observation balloon, which was used during convoy escort duty in the war. However, by late 1917, the aircraft program was cancelled and the catapults removed.

During the US participation in World War I several changes were made to these ships. All but four of the 6-inch guns were removed to arm merchant ships and reduce the potential of flooding through the lower casemates; this was a factor in the loss of San Diego (probably to a mine) in July 1918. The 3-inch single-purpose guns were reduced to ten, while two 3-inch/50 caliber anti-aircraft guns were added. However, the official Ships' Data Book series indicates that by 1921 all of the 6-inch guns were remounted, only to be dismounted again by 1929.

By 1919 the 32 Niclausse boilers in Pittsburgh (ex-Pennsylvania) and Pueblo (ex-Colorado) were replaced by 20 Babcock & Wilcox boilers. By 1921, Pueblo had 16 Babcock & Wilcox boilers, while Pittsburgh had 12 Babcock & Wilcox and eight "modified Niclausse" boilers. In 1922, Pittsburgh's forward funnel and the associated boilers were removed, leaving her with 12 Babcock & Wilcox boilers.

In 1922–1923 modernization of the eight survivors of these ships and the Tennessee class was considered but not implemented. Possible upgrades would be new boilers and engines for a speed of 25–27 kn (46–50 km/h; 29–31 mph), a more seaworthy bow, protection improvements, and new triple 8-inch/55 caliber gun turrets as in the Pensacola class.

== Service ==
The Pennsylvanias spent the years prior to 1917 patrolling Latin America and the Western Pacific. Colorado landed troops in a 1912 intervention in Nicaragua. Early in the US participation in World War I the ships operated in the South Atlantic and the Pacific, then most were transferred to convoy escort duty in the North Atlantic. Pittsburgh remained in the Pacific, unsuccessfully patrolling for German commerce raiders. While using Huntington's observation balloon on convoy escort duty on 17 September 1917, the balloon landed in the water due to rough weather, with the basket upside down and submerged. Shipfitter First Class Patrick McGunigal received the Medal of Honor for rescuing the pilot. This is said to be the first action in World War I that resulted in the award of the Medal of Honor. San Diego was sunk on 19 July 1918, probably by a mine laid by U-156 off Fire Island, New York. The wreck remains in place. Most of the ships were decommissioned or relegated to virtually stationary roles such as "receiving ship" in the early 1920s; however, Pittsburgh and Huron continued to operate for most or all of that decade. All were sold for scrap in 1930–1931 in compliance with the limits of the London Naval Treaty. Huron survived as a floating breakwater in Powell River, British Columbia until wrecked by a storm in 1961. Her wreck remains in place.

== Ships in class ==
The six ships of the Pennsylvania class were:

Ship	Hull no.	Shipyard	Laid down	Launched	Commissioned	Decommissioned	Fate
Pennsylvania	ACR-4	William Cramp & Sons, Philadelphia	7 August 1901	22 August 1903	9 March 1905	10 July 1931	Sold for scrap 21 December 1931
West Virginia	ACR-5	Newport News Shipbuilding, Newport News, Virginia	16 September 1901	18 April 1903	23 February 1905	1 September 1920	Sold for scrap 30 August 1930
California	ACR-6	Union Iron Works, San Francisco	7 May 1902	28 April 1904	1 August 1907		Mined or torpedoed by U-156 off Fire Island, NY, 19 July 1918, wreck remains in place
Colorado	ACR-7	William Cramp & Sons, Philadelphia	25 April 1901	25 April 1903	19 January 1905	28 September 1927	Sold for scrap 2 October 1930
Maryland	ACR-8	Newport News Shipbuilding, Newport News, Virginia	29 October 1901	12 September 1903	18 April 1905	14 February 1922	Sold for scrap 11 February 1930
South Dakota	ACR-9	Union Iron Works, San Francisco	30 September 1902	21 July 1904	27 January 1908	17 June 1927	Sold for scrap 11 February 1930, used as floating breakwater in British Columbia until wrecked 18 February 1961, wreck remains in place

The Pennsylvania class was renamed 1912–1920 to free their names for new battleships; they were given the designation CA (armored cruiser) on 17 July 1920 with the USN's adoption of the hull-number system

Original Name	Commission Date	Renamed	Rename Date	Reclassed	Reclassed Date
Pennsylvania (ACR-4)	9 March 1905	Pittsburgh (ACR-4)	27 August 1912	Pittsburgh (CA-4)	17 July 1920
West Virginia (ACR-5)	23 February 1905	Huntington (ACR-5)	11 November 1916	Huntington (CA-5)	17 July 1920
California (ACR-6)	1 August 1907	San Diego (ACR-6)	1 September 1914	sunk before reclassified	N/A
Colorado (ACR-7)	19 January 1905	Pueblo (ACR-7)	9 September 1916	Pueblo (CA-7)	17 July 1920
Maryland (ACR-8)	18 April 1905	Frederick (ACR-8)	9 November 1916	Frederick (CA-8)	17 July 1920
South Dakota (ACR-9)	27 January 1908	Huron (ACR-9)	7 June 1920	Huron (CA-9)	17 July 1920

== See also ==
- Tennessee-class cruiser – extensive discussion of US armored cruiser development and comparisons with foreign designs
- List of cruisers of the United States Navy

== Bibliography ==
- Bauer, K. Jack; Roberts, Stephen S. (1991). Register of Ships of the U.S. Navy, 1775–1990: Major Combatants. Westport, Connecticut: Greenwood Press. ISBN 0-313-26202-0.
- Friedman, Norman (1984). U.S. Cruisers: An Illustrated Design History. Annapolis, Maryland: Naval Institute Press. ISBN 0-87021-718-6.
- Gardiner, Robert; Chesneau, Roger (1979). Conway's All the World's Fighting Ships 1860–1905. New York: Mayflower Books. ISBN 0-8317-0302-4.
