= 8-inch/45-caliber gun =

8"/45 caliber Mark 6
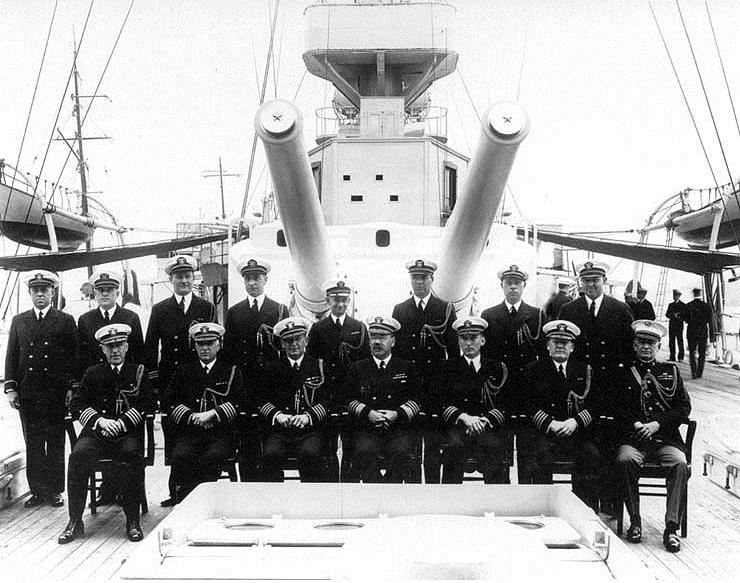
- Admiral Montgomery M. Taylor, Commander-in-Chief of the U.S Navy Asiatic Fleet, and his fleet staff aboard the USS Rochester (CA-2) at Shanghai, China, in 1932. Front row (left to right): Captain Montgomery E. Higgins, M.C.; Captain Ivan E. Bass; Captain Frank J. Fletcher; Admiral Montgomery M. Taylor; Commander Donald B. Beary; Captain Jeffrey F. Kutz, S.C.; and Colonel Jeffrey F. Dyer, U.S. Marine Corps. Back row (not in order): Lieutenant Henri H. Smith-Hutton; Lieutenant Commander Charles A. MacGowan; Lieutenant Commander Philip W. Warren; Lieutenant Commander Francis T. Spellman; and Lieutenant Junior Grade Royal Lovell. Other officers are unidentified. United States Navy Historical Photo #: NH 83799
- Type: Naval gun; Coastal artillery; Railway gun
- Place of origin: United States

Service history
- In service: 1906
- Used by: United States Navy; United States Army; Hellenic Navy
- Wars: World War I; Greco-Turkish War; World War II

Production history
- Designer: Bureau of Ordnance
- Designed: 1900
- Manufacturer: U.S. Naval Gun Factory
- No. built: 148 (Nos. 108–255)
- Variants: Mark 6 Mod 1 – Mod 4

Specifications
- Mass: 41,518 lb (18,832 kg) (without breech); 41,988 lb (19,045 kg) (with breech)
- Length: 30 ft 9 in (9.37 m)
- Barrel length: 30 ft 0 in (9.14 m) bore (45 calibers)
- Shell: 260 lb (120 kg) naval armor-piercing; 260 lb (120 kg) army AP Mark 20; 240 lb (110 kg) army high-explosive M103
- Caliber: 8 in (203 mm)
- Recoil: 28.5 in (720 mm) max
- Elevation: Marks 12: −7° to +20°; Marks 5: −7° to +20°; M1A1: −0° to +45°
- Traverse: −135° to +135° naval mounts; 360° army M1A1 mount
- Rate of fire: 1 to 2 rounds per minute
- Muzzle velocity: 2,750 ft/s (840 m/s) naval AP; 2,100 ft/s (640 m/s) army AP; 2,750 ft/s (840 m/s) army AP (super charge); 2,150 ft/s (660 m/s) army HE; 2,840 ft/s (870 m/s) army HE (super charge)
- Effective firing range: 22,500 yd (20,574 m) at 20.1° elevation; 35,300 yd (32,278 m) at 45° elevation (Army RR gun)

The 8"/45 caliber Mark 6 gun (spoken "eight-inch-forty-five--caliber") were used for the secondary batteries of the United States Navy's last pre-dreadnought battleships and refitted in older armored cruisers main batteries.

== Design ==
The 8-inch (203 mm)/45 caliber gun was developed after the Spanish–American War to use the new smokeless powder that had recently been adopted by the Navy. This gun was much stronger than its predecessor, the 8-inch/40 caliber gun, which were incapable of handling the new powder. This was shown when the muzzle of one of Colorado's guns blew off on 22 June 1907, during gunnery practice off Shantung. The Mark 6, gun Nos. 108–255, 148 in total, was constructed of tube, jacket, four hoops a locking ring and the liner with a Welin breech block. These were all constructed of nickel steel. There were a total of eight different Mods, Mark 6 Mod 0 to Mark 6 Mod 7, with different liners, breech mechanisms, chambers, and rifling being used.

== Service history ==
The guns mounted in the Virginia-class battleships were in an unusual two-level turret with the 8-inch guns on top of the larger 12-inch (305 mm) guns. This arrangement ultimately proved unsuccessful but helped the Navy in the successful development of superfiring turrets later used in the dreadnought South Carolina.

Due to an older 8-inch/40 caliber Mark 5s muzzle blowing off during gunnery practice in Colorado on 22 June 1907, all Mark 5s were removed from service, rebuilt, and placed in reserve. Because of this, all Pennsylvania-class armored cruisers and the armored cruiser New York, were refit with the newer Mark 6 guns.

With the signing of the Washington Naval Treaty, the pre-dreadnoughts still in service were required to be scrapped. This surplussed up to 48 guns, which the Army used for coastal artillery, using new mountings and new lighter, and more streamlined, projectiles.

== Naval Service ==
Ship	Gun Installed	Gun Mount
USS Virginia (BB-13)	Mark 6: 8"/45 caliber	Mark 12: 2 × twin turrets; Mark 5: 2 × dual-caliber turrets
USS Nebraska (BB-14)	Mark 6: 8"/45 caliber	Mark 12: 2 × twin turrets; Mark 5: 2 × dual-caliber turrets
USS Georgia (BB-15)	Mark 6: 8"/45 caliber	Mark 12: 2 × twin turrets; Mark 5: 2 × dual-caliber turrets
USS New Jersey (BB-16)	Mark 6: 8"/45 caliber	Mark 12: 2 × twin turrets; Mark 5: 2 × dual-caliber turrets
USS Rhode Island (BB-17)	Mark 6: 8"/45 caliber	Mark 12: 2 × twin turrets; Mark 5: 2 × dual-caliber turrets
USS Connecticut (BB-18)	Mark 6: 8"/45 caliber	Mark 12: 4 × twin turrets
USS Louisiana (BB-19)	Mark 6: 8"/45 caliber	Mark 12: 4 × twin turrets
USS Vermont (BB-20)	Mark 6: 8"/45 caliber	Mark 12: 4 × twin turrets
USS Kansas (BB-21)	Mark 6: 8"/45 caliber	Mark 12: 4 × twin turrets
USS Minnesota (BB-22)	Mark 6: 8"/45 caliber	Mark 12: 4 × twin turrets
USS New Hampshire (BB-25)	Mark 6: 8"/45 caliber	Mark 12: 4 × twin turrets
USS Mississippi (BB-23)	Mark 6: 8"/45 caliber	Mark 12: 4 × twin turrets
USS Idaho (BB-24)	Mark 6: 8"/45 caliber	Mark 12: 4 × twin turrets
USS New York (ACR-2)	Mark 6: 8"/45 caliber	Mark 12: 2 × twin turrets
USS Pennsylvania (ACR-4)	Mark 6: 8"/45 caliber	Mark 12: 2 × twin turrets
USS West Virginia (ACR-5)	Mark 6: 8"/45 caliber	Mark 12: 2 × twin turrets
USS California (ACR-6)	Mark 6: 8"/45 caliber	Mark 12: 2 × twin turrets
USS Colorado (ACR-7)	Mark 6: 8"/45 caliber	Mark 12: 2 × twin turrets
USS Maryland (ACR-8)	Mark 6: 8"/45 caliber	Mark 12: 2 × twin turrets
USS South Dakota (ACR-9)	Mark 6: 8"/45 caliber	Mark 12: 2 × twin turrets

== Coast defense service ==
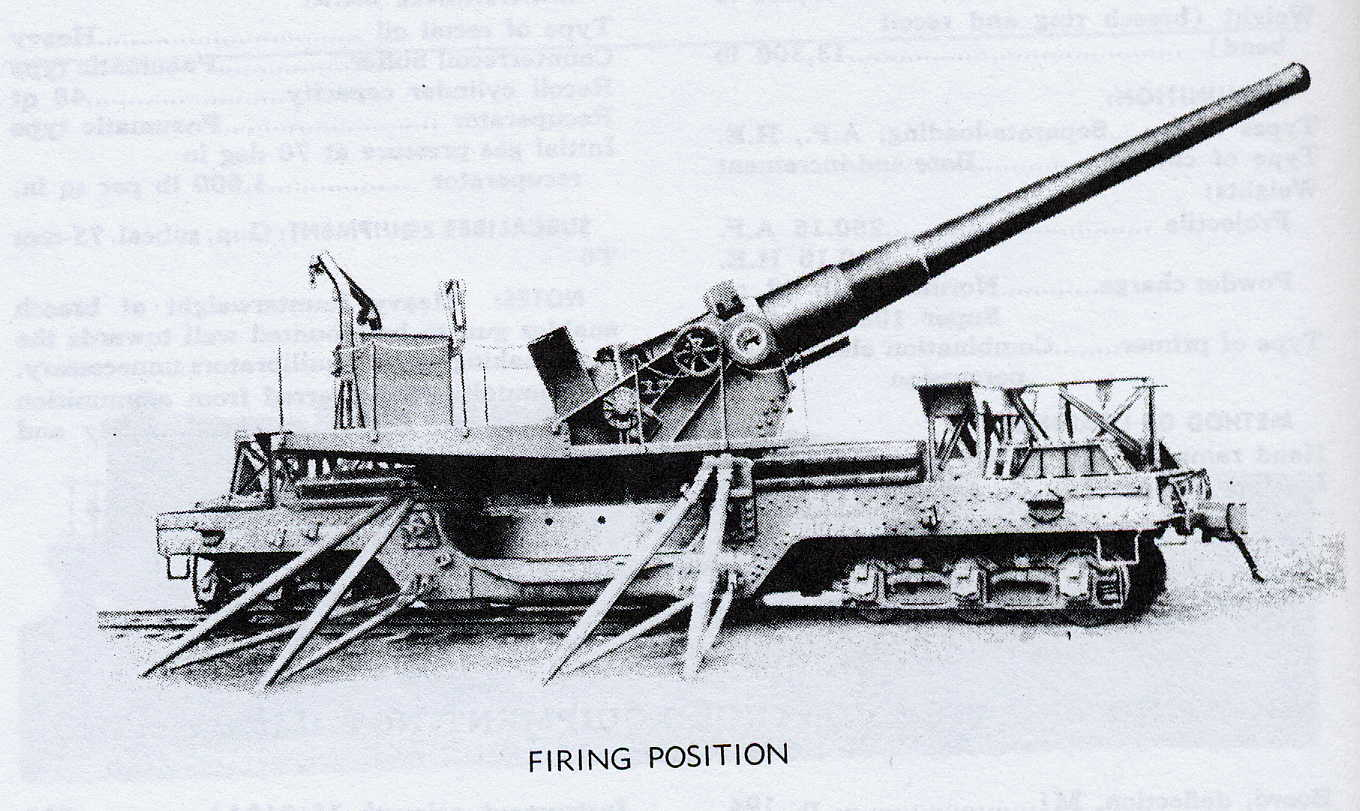
8-inch Mk.VI M3A2 railway gun

Up to 48 of these weapons served as coast defense weapons with the United States Army Coast Artillery Corps in World War II. They were designated "8-inch Navy gun Mk.VI M3A2". Twenty-four to thirty-two of these weapons were on the M1 railway mounting, divided into four-gun batteries, stationed in Delaware, Los Angeles, and Puget Sound, among other CONUS locations. Sixteen additional weapons were mounted in two-gun batteries in fixed emplacements on the M1 barbette carriage, with some additional batteries not completed. Most of the fixed weapons were in Alaska, Hawaii, and Puerto Rico.

== Surviving Examples ==
Four weapons of this type survive, all previously used in coast defense:

- One gun at Fort Miles, Delaware, on M1 railway proof mount (experimentally bored out to 9.12-inch (232 mm)) (was previously at Naval Surface Warfare Center Dahlgren Division, Dahlgren, VA
- Two 8-inch Guns Mk VI M3A2 (#160L2 & #154L2), Battery 404, Fort Abercrombie, Kodiak, AK
- One 8-inch Gun Mk VI M3A2 (#134L2), Kodiak Airport, Kodiak, AK (gun formerly at Battery 403, Fort J.H. Smith, Kodiak, AK)
