= USS Colorado (ACR-7) =

United States Navy Pennsylvania-class armored cruiser

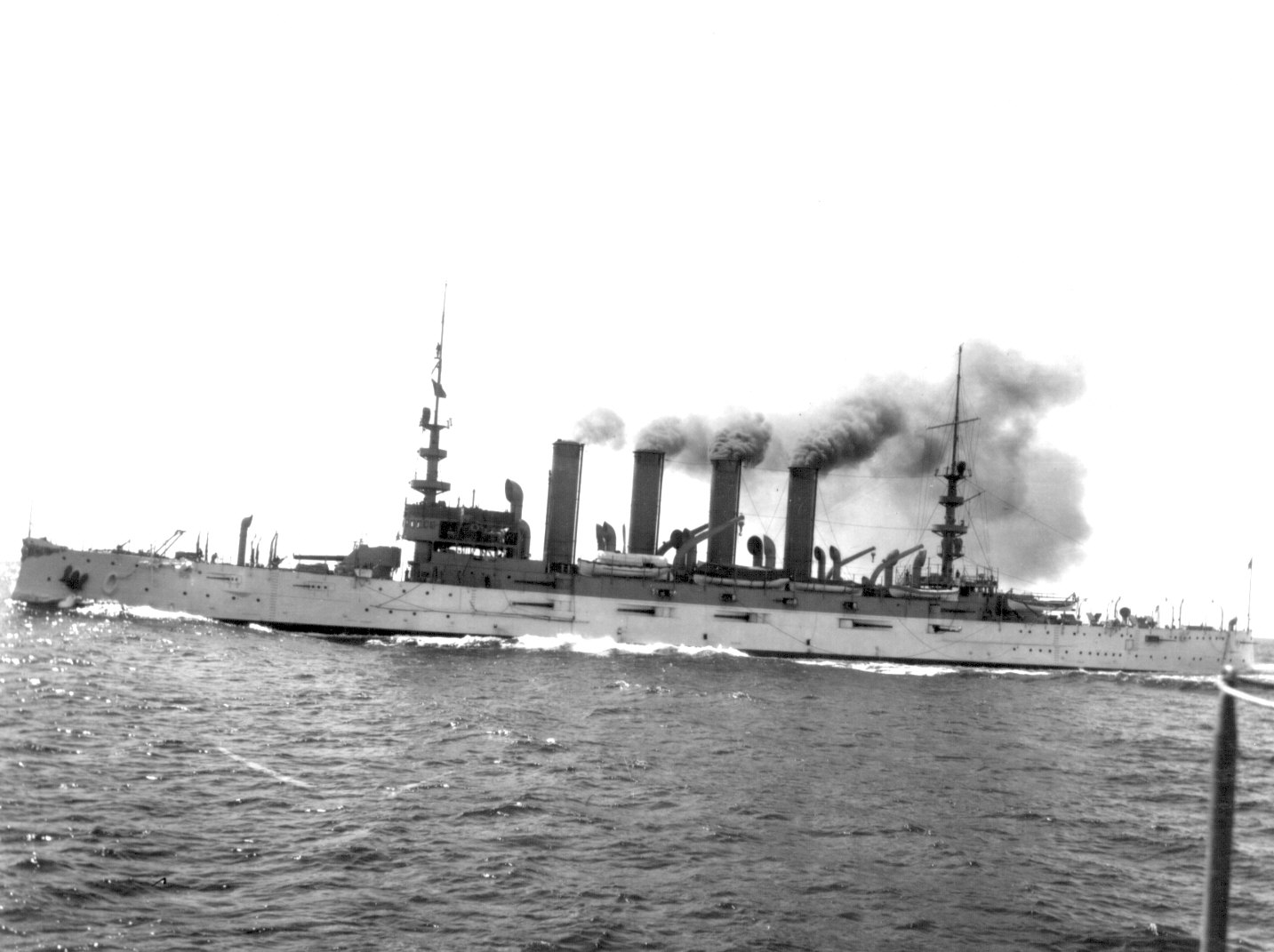
- USS Colorado (ACR-7), port side view September 1907.

History

United States
- Name: USS Colorado (1903–1916); USS Pueblo (1916–1930)
- Namesake: State of Colorado; City of Pueblo, Colorado
- Ordered: 7 June 1900
- Awarded: 10 January 1901
- Builder: William Cramp & Sons, Philadelphia, Pennsylvania
- Cost: $3,780,000 (contract price of hull and machinery)
- Yard number: 316
- Laid down: 25 April 1901
- Launched: 25 April 1903
- Sponsored by: Miss C. M. Peabody
- Commissioned: 19 January 1905
- Decommissioned: 28 September 1927
- Renamed: Pueblo, 9 September 1916
- Reclassified: CA-7, 17 July 1920
- Identification: Hull symbol: ACR-7; Hull symbol: CA-7
- Fate: Sold for scrap, 2 October 1930

General characteristics (as built)
- Class & type: Pennsylvania-class armored cruiser
- Displacement: 13,680 long tons (13,900 t) (standard); 15,138 long tons (15,381 t) (full load)
- Length: 504 ft (154 m) oa; 502 ft (153 m) pp
- Beam: 69 ft 6 in (21.18 m)
- Draft: 24 ft 1 in (7.34 m) (mean)
- Installed power: 32 × Niclausse boilers; 23,000 ihp (17,000 kW)
- Propulsion: 2 × vertical triple expansion reciprocating engines; 2 × screws
- Speed: 22 kn (41 km/h; 25 mph); 22.24 kn (41.19 km/h; 25.59 mph) (Speed on Trials)
- Complement: 80 officers 745 enlisted 64 Marines
- Armament: 4 × 8 in (203 mm)/40 caliber Mark 5 breech-loading (BL) rifles(2×2); 14 × 6 in (152 mm)/50 cal Mark 6 BL rifles; 18 × 3 in (76 mm)/50 cal rapid-fire guns; 12 × 3-pounder (47 mm (1.9 in)) Driggs-Schroeder guns; 2 × 1-pounder (37 mm (1.5 in)) Driggs-Schroeder saluting guns; 2 × 18 inch (450 mm) torpedo tubes
- Armor: Belt: 6 in (152 mm) (top & waterline); 5 in (127 mm) (bottom); Deck: 1 1/2 in (38 mm) - 6 in (amidships); 4 in (102 mm) (forward & aft); Barbettes: 6 in; Turrets: 6 - 6 1/2 in (165 mm); Conning Tower: 9 in (229 mm)

General characteristics (Pre-1911 Refit)
- Installed power: 16 × Babcock & Wilcox boilers
- Armament: 4 × 8 in/45 cal Mark 6 BL rifles (2×2); 14 × 6 in/50 cal Mark 6 BL rifles; 18 × 3 in/50 cal rapid-fire guns; 4 × 3-pounder (47 mm) Driggs-Schroeder saluting guns; 2 × 18 in torpedo tubes

General characteristics (Pre-1921 Refit)
- Armament: 4 × 8 in/45 cal Mark 6 BL rifles (2×2); 14 × 6 in/50 cal Mark 6 BL rifles; 10 × 3 in/50 cal rapid-fire guns; 2 × 3 in/50 caliber anti-aircraft guns; 4 × 3-pounder (47 mm) Driggs-Schroeder saluting guns; 2 × 18 in torpedo tubes

The USS Colorado (ACR-7), also referred to as "Armored Cruiser No. 7", and renamed USS Pueblo (CA-7) in 1916, was a United States Navy Pennsylvania-class armored cruiser. She was the second US Navy ship named Colorado, and the first to be named after the State of Colorado. The first, Colorado, was named for the Colorado River.

== Construction ==
Colorado was laid down on 25 April 1901, by William Cramp & Sons, Philadelphia, and launched two years later on 25 April 1903. She was sponsored by Miss C. M. Peabody, the daughter of the Governor of Colorado, James H. Peabody; and commissioned on 19 January 1905.

== Service history ==
=== Pre-World War I ===
Colorado sailed on her shakedown cruise down the east coast to Target Bay, Culebra Island, Puerto Rico, to train in Caribbean waters, reaching Culebra, on 24 March 1905. Following the shakedown, she joined Division Four, Cruiser Squadron, Atlantic Fleet, at Provincetown, Massachusetts, on 14 May. Colorado took part in the preliminary test of Dewey, a steel floating dry dock near Solomons Island, Maryland, from 23 to 24 June 1905.

Colorado participated in a fleet problem in the Caribbean, from 10 January–17 April 1906. Captain Kennedy died while the armored cruiser maneuvered at sea. He was buried ashore at Guantánamo Bay, Cuba, and Lieutenant Commander Joseph L. Jayne, assumed command of the ship on 12 April 1906.

President Roosevelt held a Presidential Naval Review of a number of ships including Colorado, Florida, USS Indiana (BB-1), Truxtun, and transport Yankee at Oyster Bay, New York, from 2–4 September 1906. Colorado then sailed for duty on the Asiatic Station, on 7 September 1906. After cruising to Japan and China to represent American interests in the Far East, she returned to San Francisco, on 27 September 1907, for exercises along the Californian and Mexican coasts, in the Hawaiian Islands, and off Central and South America.

The running aground of Colorado on 15 August 1908, lead to the upgrading and improvements of lighthouses in Puget Sound. On 26 August 1909, one of her launches had a minor collision with the ferry City of Seattle, between West Seattle and Seattle, with minor damage. She served again in the Far East, from September 1909 – February 1910.

Ceremonial visits and receptions for dignitaries highlighted the next two years, and from November 1911 – July 1912, Colorado returned to the Far East for duty. Between August and November, she sailed to land and support expeditionary troops at Corinto, Nicaragua, then patrolled Mexican waters until placed in reduced commission at Puget Sound Navy Yard on 17 May 1913.

Once more in full commission on 9 February 1915, she sailed as the flagship of the Pacific Reserve Fleet, patrolling in Mexican waters and observing and keeping in touch with interned merchant ships during the revolution. She returned to reserve status on 26 September 1915.

=== World War I ===
She was renamed Pueblo, in order to free up her original name for use with the Colorado-class battleship Colorado, on 9 November 1916, while in overhaul.

After Submarine H-3 ran aground in Humboldt Bay, California, on 14 December 1916. USS Milwaukee (C-21) sailed for Eureka, to assist in salvaging the boat on 5 January 1917. While she attempted to float the submarine on 13 January, the cruiser stranded in the first line of breakers at Samoa Beach, off Eureka. Her crewmen reached shore safely. Pueblo made for the area and stood by Milwaukee on 24 January, but attempts to salvage the stricken cruiser proved unsuccessful. Milwaukee was decommissioned on 6 March 1917, and a storm in November 1918, broke the ship in two.

Pueblo returned to full commission upon the entry of the United States into World War I, and as flagship of the Scouting Force patrolled the South Atlantic, protecting shipping, paying diplomatic calls to South American ports, and preventing the sailing of German and Austrian ships interned at Bahia, Brazil.

Pueblo returned to Norfolk, Virginia on 18 January 1918, and from 5 February – 16 October, made seven voyages to escort convoys carrying men and supplies to England. After carrying the Brazilian ambassador to the United States to Rio de Janeiro, she returned to transatlantic duty, making six voyages between Hoboken and Brest, France, to bring home veterans of the American Expeditionary Force.

=== Post war ===
Pueblo arrived at Philadelphia, on 8 August 1919, and was placed in reduced commission until decommissioned on 22 September. She was redesignated CA-7 in 1920. In commission for the last time from 2 April 1921 – 28 September 1927, she served as receiving ship in the 3rd Naval District. She was scrapped on 2 October 1930, in accordance with the London Naval Treaty for the reduction of naval armaments.

== In popular culture ==
A plaque commemorating the crew of USS Colorado was shown briefly in season 13, episode 1 of American Pickers.
