= USS West Virginia (ACR-5) =

United States Navy Pennsylvania-class armored cruiser

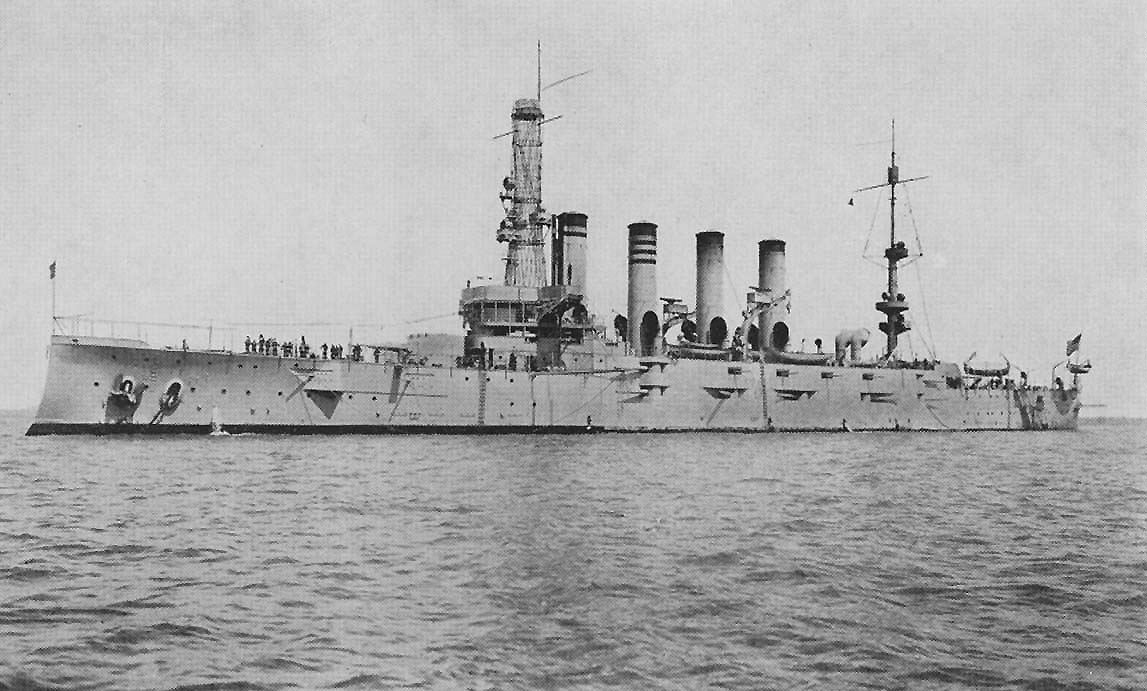
- USS Huntington (ACR-5), port view, 1919. Showing cage masts installed 1911 and catapult removed.

History

United States
- Name: West Virginia (1905–1916); Huntington (1916–1930)
- Namesake: State of West Virginia; City of Huntington, West Virginia
- Ordered: 3 March 1899
- Awarded: 24 January 1901
- Builder: Newport News Drydock & Shipbuilding Co., Newport News, Virginia
- Cost: $3,885,000 (contract price of hull and machinery)
- Laid down: 16 September 1901
- Launched: 18 April 1903
- Sponsored by: Miss Katherine V. White
- Commissioned: 23 February 1905
- Decommissioned: 1 September 1920
- Renamed: Huntington, 11 November 1916
- Reclassified: CA-5, 17 July 1920
- Stricken: 12 March 1930
- Identification: Hull symbol: ACR-5; Hull symbol: CA-5
- Fate: Sold for scrap, 30 August 1930

General characteristics (as built)
- Class & type: Pennsylvania-class armored cruiser
- Displacement: 13,680 long tons (13,900 t) (standard); 15,138 long tons (15,381 t) (full load)
- Length: 503 ft 11 in (153.59 m) oa; 502 ft (153 m) pp
- Beam: 69 ft 6 in (21.18 m)
- Draft: 24 ft 1 in (7.34 m) (mean)
- Installed power: 16 × Babcock & Wilcox boilers; 23,000 ihp (17,000 kW)
- Propulsion: 2 × vertical triple expansion reciprocating engines; 2 × screws
- Speed: 22 kn (41 km/h; 25 mph); 22.15 kn (41.02 km/h; 25.49 mph) (Speed on Trials)
- Complement: 80 officers 745 enlisted 64 Marines
- Armament: 4 × 8 in (203 mm)/40 caliber Mark 5 breech-loading (BL) rifles(2×2); 14 × 6 in (152 mm)/50 cal Mark 6 BL rifles; 18 × 3 in (76 mm)/50 cal rapid-fire guns; 12 × 3-pounder (47 mm (1.9 in)) Driggs-Schroeder guns; 2 × 1-pounder (37 mm (1.5 in)) Driggs-Schroeder saluting guns; 2 × 18 inch (450 mm) torpedo tubes
- Armor: Belt: 6 in (150 mm) (top & waterline); 5 in (130 mm) (bottom); Deck: 1 1/2 in (38 mm)- 6 in (amidships); 4 in (100 mm) (forward & aft); Barbettes: 6 in; Turrets: 6 - 6 1/2 in (170 mm); Conning Tower: 9 in (230 mm)

General characteristics (Pre-1911 Refit)
- Armament: 4 × 8 in/45 cal Mark 6 BL rifles (2×2); 14 × 6 in/50 cal Mark 6 BL rifles; 18 × 3 in/50 cal rapid-fire guns; 4 × 3-pounder (47 mm) Driggs-Schroeder saluting guns; 2 × 18 in torpedo tubes

General characteristics (Pre-1921 Refit)
- Armament: 4 × 8 in/45 caliber Mark 6 BL rifles (2×2); 14 × 6 in/50 Mark 6 caliber BL rifles; 10 × 3 in/50 caliber rapid-fire guns; 2 × 3 in/50 caliber anti-aircraft guns; 4 × 3-pounder (47 mm) Driggs-Schroeder saluting guns; 2 × 18 in torpedo tubes
- Aircraft carried: 4 × floatplanes (1917)
- Aviation facilities: 1 × Aft catapult (1917)

USS West Virginia (hull number ACR-5/CA-5), also referred to as "Armored Cruiser No. 5", was a United States Navy Pennsylvania-class armored cruiser and the first United States Navy vessel named for the U.S. state of West Virginia. She was renamed Huntington in 1916 as the U.S. Navy designated that only battleships would carry the names of U.S. states.

The ship was launched on 18 April 1903 by Newport News Drydock & Shipbuilding Co., Newport News, Virginia, sponsored by Miss Katherine V. White, and commissioned on 23 February 1905, Captain C. H. Arnold in command. After 15 years in active service, Huntington was decommissioned in September 1920, struck from the naval register in March 1930, and sold for scrap later that year.

== Pre-World War I ==
After shakedown training, West Virginia cruised with the New York Naval Militia as a unit of the Atlantic Fleet until 30 September 1906 when she sailed for duty with the Asiatic Fleet. The ship remained with the Asiatic Fleet (which was downgraded in status to that of First Squadron of the Pacific Fleet in early 1907) on training operations for two years, and after overhaul at Mare Island in 1908 joined the Pacific Fleet for similar exercises along the West Coast of the United States. In 1911–1912, she made a cruise with the Fleet to Hawaiian waters and in 1914 steamed on special duty off the west coast of Mexico for the protection of American interests. She remained off Mexico during the Veracruz crisis, and returned to Bremerton, Washington, to become a part of the Pacific Reserve Fleet.

West Virginia remained at Bremerton, Washington, until 20 September 1916, when she again sailed to Mexico for the protection of American lives and property and to back up U.S. diplomacy. While on this service, she was renamed Huntington on 11 November to permit the assignment of her old name to a newly authorized battleship, BB-48. After five months service off Mexico, she steamed to Mare Island for the installation of catapult devices on the quarterdeck and equipment to accommodate four seaplanes on the boat deck ways.

== World War I ==
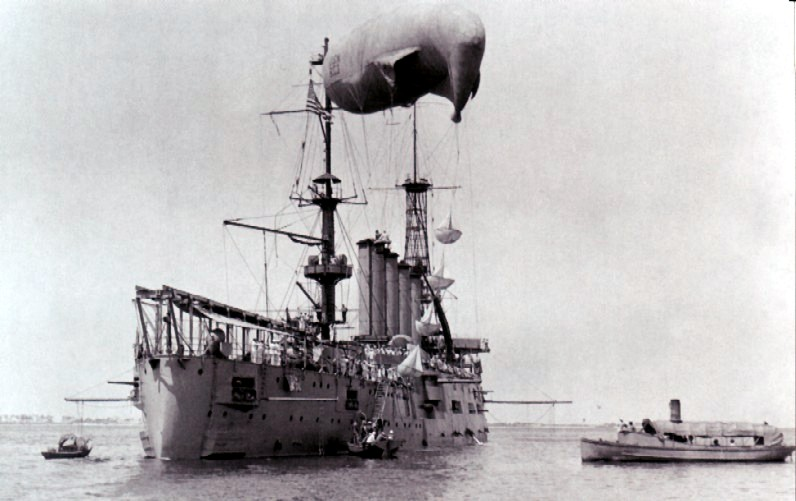
USS Huntington (ACR-5) anchored at Pensacola, FL in 1917, putting aloft a rather under-inflated Kite balloon. Note the long stabilizing tail on the balloon.

Huntington was detached from the Reserve Force and placed in full commission on 5 April 1917. She departed Mare Island on 11 May and steamed to Pensacola, Florida, via the Panama Canal. Detached from the Pacific Fleet after her arrival in Florida on 28 May, she spent the next two months at the Naval Air Station Pensacola, engaging in a series of important early experiments with balloons and seaplanes launched from the deck. The cruiser then sailed for Hampton Roads on 1 August and arrived New York five days later. There, Huntington formed with a convoy of six troopships bound for France departing on 8 September. En route, several balloon observation flights were made, and on one of these on 17 September, the balloon was forced down by a squall while being brought back on board and the observer, Lieutenant (jg) Henry W. Hoyt, was knocked out of the basket and caught underwater entangled in its rigging. Seeing the emergency, shipfitter Patrick McGunigal jumped overboard to release the crewman from the balloon basket, by then overturned and underwater. For his heroic action, McGunigal was awarded World War I's 3rd Medal of Honor. The day after the rescue, the convoy was turned over to American destroyers in European waters; and Huntington steamed back to Hampton Roads, arriving 30 September.

After replenishing at Norfolk, Huntington sailed to New York on 5 October to have her catapult and seaplanes removed. She got underway on 27 October and arrived Halifax, Nova Scotia, two days later to embark together with St. Louis on a high-level US Commission to confer with the Allies. Presidential envoy, Colonel Edward M. House; Admiral William S. Benson; General Tasker H. Bliss; and other dignitaries took passage in Huntington, arriving Davenport, England on 7 November, to be met by British officials. Huntington departed for New York, via Hampton Roads, arriving on 27 November.

Subsequently, the cruiser returned to the important duty of escorting convoys of troops and supplies to Europe, making nine such voyages to Europe and back from 19 February-13 November 1918. In addition, Huntington made three coastal convoy passages from New York to Hampton Roads. She entered Brooklyn Navy Yard on 17 November for conversion to a troop transport.

Huntington made nine trips across the Atlantic Ocean with the following ships in convoy:

=== Port of departure and sailing date ===
- First Trip— New York, September 7. 1917 Pastores, Pocahontas, DeKalb, Tenadores, Mallory and the Mawmee, Destroyers McCall and Duncan were also in the convoy.
- Second Trip Halifax, X. S.. October 29, 1917 Col. Lions and party came aboard for transportation to Davenport, England. Cruiser St. Louis and destroyers Downes and Balch accompanied them.
- Third Trip— New York, February 18, 1918 George Washington, Pastores, President Grant, Manchuria, Covington, El Sol, Susquehanna and DeKalb.
- Fourth Trip— New York, April 10, 1918 Covington and President Grant.
- Fifth Trip— Hampton Roads, May 18, 1918 Calamares, Madawaska, Pocahontas, Bridge, President Grant, Occidente, Zeelandia, Due d' Abruzzi, Re d' Italia and destroyers Little and Kimberly.
- Sixth Trip— New York, June 28, 1918 Justicia, Metagoma, Vretic, Mentor, Saxon, Nestor, Plassey, Lapland, Hororata, Teiresias, Melita, Osterly, Brambleleaf and H. M. S. Virginian, an auxiliary cruiser.
- Seventh Trip— New York, July 26, 1918 Kroonland, Finland, Taormina, Pocahontas, Susquehanna, Caserta, Due d' Aosta and the destroyer Rathburne.
- Eighth Trip— New York, September 8, 1918 Manchuria, Mercury, Desna, Mallory, Huron, Madawaska, Zeelandia, Due d' Abruzzi, Re d' Italia and the destroyers Walke and Taylor.
- Ninth Trip— New York, October 14, 1918 Mallory. Mercury, Huron, Zeelandia, Madawaska, Due d' Abruzzi, Re d' Italia and the destroyers Fairfax and Israel. The battleship Virginia was also in the convoy.

The U. S. S. Huntington made four short trips through the submarine zone off the Atlantic Coast of the United States with the following ships in convoy:

- First Trip — Hampton Roads, June 23, 1918 Pocahontas, Susquehanna, Due d' Aosta, Caserta and the destroyers Fairfax, Jewett and Paul Jones.
- Second Trip— Hampton Roads, July 18, 1918 Pastores. Dante Alighieri, Wilhelmina, Czaritza and Princess Matoika.
- Third Trip— Hampton Roads. August 22, 1918 Pastores, Dante Alighieri, Lutetia. Antigone, Princess Matoika, Czaritza and the destroyers Fairfax and Hull.
- Fourth Trip — Hampton Roads, November 12, 1918 Kroonland, Susquehanna and the Tenadores.

== Inter-war period ==
Assigned to Cruiser and Transport Force, Atlantic Fleet, Huntington next sailed for France to bring home veterans of the European fighting. She departed New York on 17 December, arrived Brest 29 December, and brought over 1,700 passengers to New York on 14 January 1919. The ship made five more voyages to France and return, bringing home nearly 12,000 troops, and terminated her last voyage at Boston on 5 July. Detached from Transport Force, she was reassigned to Cruiser Force and became flagship of Flying Squadron 1 on 8 July. Huntington decommissioned at Portsmouth Navy Yard, Kittery, Maine on 1 September 1920. She was struck from the Naval Vessel Register on 12 March 1930 and sold for scrapping on 30 August, in accordance with the London Naval Treaty for the reduction of naval armaments. The bell from the armored cruiser was given to West Virginia University, dedicated in 1967, and now occupies a place in Oglebay Plaza along with the mast from the USS West Virginia (BB-48).

== Bibliography ==
- Alden, John D. American Steel Navy: A Photographic History of the U.S. Navy from the Introduction of the Steel Hull in 1883 to the Cruise of the Great White Fleet. Annapolis, Maryland: Naval Institute Press, 1989. ISBN 0-87021-248-6
- Friedman, Norman. U.S. Cruisers: An Illustrated Design History. Annapolis, Maryland: Naval Institute Press, 1984. ISBN 0-87021-718-6
- Musicant, Ivan. U.S. Armored Cruisers: A Design and Operational History. Annapolis, Maryland: Naval Institute Press, 1985. ISBN 0-87021-714-3
- Taylor, Michael J.H. (1990). Jane's Fighting Ships of World War I. Studio. ISBN 1-85170-378-0.
