= 8-inch/35-caliber gun =

8"/35 caliber Mark 3 & 4 / 8"/40 caliber Mark 5 Naval Gun
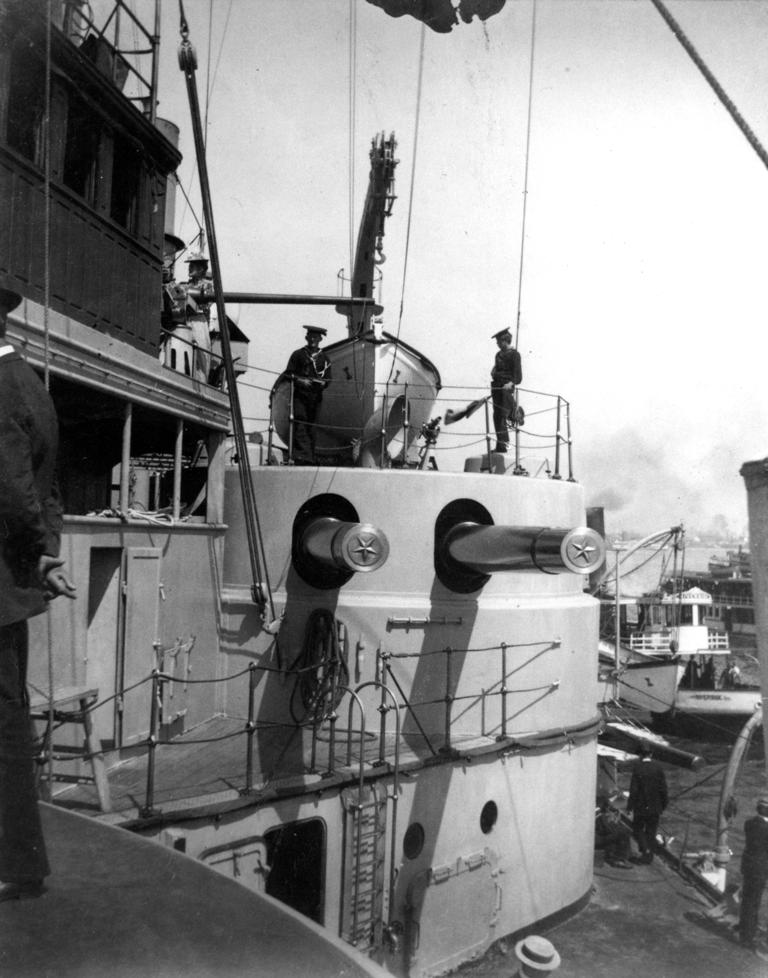
- Crewmen standing atop USS Indiana forward port side 8-inch gun turret, circa the later 1890s.
- Type: Naval gun
- Place of origin: United States

Service history
- In service: Mark 3: 1890; Mark 5: 1894
- Used by: United States Navy
- Wars: Spanish–American War; World War I

Production history
- Designer: Bureau of Ordnance
- Designed: 1889
- Manufacturer: U.S. Naval Gun Factory
- No. built: Mark 3: 19 (Nos. 9–21, 33–37, and 51); Mark 4: 56 (Nos. 22–32, 38–50, and 52–83); Mark 5: 24 (Nos. 84–107)
- Variants: Marks 3–5

Specifications
- Mass: Mark 3: 29,400 lb (13,300 kg) (without breech); Mark 5: 40,151 lb (18,212 kg) (without breech); Mark 5: 40,621 lb (18,425 kg) (with breech)
- Length: Marks 3 & 4: 25 ft 4.5 in (7.73 m); Mark 5: 28 ft 7 in (8.71 m)
- Barrel length: Marks 3 & 4: 24 ft 7 in (7.49 m) bore (35 calibers); Mark 5: 27 ft 10 in (8.48 m) bore (40 calibers)
- Shell: 260 lb (120 kg) armor-piercing
- Caliber: 8 in (203 mm)
- Elevation: Marks 3 and 4: -5° to +20°; Marks 5 and 6: −4° to +13°; Marks 7, 8, and 9: −7° to +14°
- Traverse: Bow and Stern Mountings: −150° to +150°; New York Amidships Mountings: 140°; Brooklyn Amidships Mountings: 140°
- Rate of fire: 1890s: 0.5 – 0.8 rounds per minute; 1900s: 2 – 2.8 rounds per minute
- Muzzle velocity: Marks 3 & 4: 2,100 ft/s (640 m/s); Mark 5: 2,500 ft/s (760 m/s)
- Effective firing range: Marks 3 & 4: 16,000 yd (14,630 m) at 20.1° elevation

The 8"/35 caliber gun Mark 3 and Mark 4 (spoken "eight-inch-thirty-five–caliber") were used for the main batteries of the United States Navy's first armored cruisers and the secondary batteries for their first battleships, the Indiana-class. The 8"/40 caliber gun Mark 5 initially armed the Pennsylvania-class armored cruisers.

== Mark 3 ==
The Mark 3 Experimental was a 30 caliber gun that used trunnions and had 11 hoops with the outer hoop starting 4 in (100 mm) from the breech and running out to the muzzle. The Mark 3s consisted of gun Nos. 9 – 27, 33 – 37, and 51. The production Mark 3 Mod 0 had removable trunnions, 96–97 in (2,400–2,500 mm) from the breech, 35 caliber gun that had 11 hoops with the outer hoop starting 4 inches from the breech and running out to 43.5 in (1,100 mm) from the muzzle. This gun was removed from service prior to World War I. The Mark 3 Mod 1 was constructed of tube, jacket and eight hoops while Mod 2 was identical to Mod 1 but with different steps under the chase hoops. Mod 3 was, for one gun, lengthened to 40 calibers and was removed from service prior to the start of World War I. Mod 4 was, also for one gun only, different from other Mods in having a ring shrunk onto the breech end, tapering the breech, and with a small balancing hoop screwed onto the front chase hoop. Mod 5 had the trunnions removed and the outer jacket threaded to accept a sleeve. Mod 6, gun Nos. 52 and 82 – 83, were constructed of nickel-steel in a simplified three-piece construction.

== Mark 4 ==
The Mark 4s were Nos. 22 – 32, 38 – 50, and 52 – 83. The original Mark 4 Mod 0 guns were identical to Mark 3 Mod 1 guns with the trunnion hoop and elevating band removed and with the threads formerly under the trunnion hoop being continued to the rear of the gun. This allowed these guns to be screwed into the sleeve of a two-gun turret mount. Mark 4 Mod 1 was one Mark 4 gun, No. 27, shortened by 0.66 in (17 mm) in rear of the threads. Mods 2 through 9 were for minor differences primarily for testing different mounting techniques. Mod 10 was for one gun cut down to 23 calibers and used for experimental work with high-explosive shells. Mod 11 was a Mod 4 gun, No. 72, with an alloy steel liner, uniformed rifling and modified chamber.

== Mark 5 ==
The Mark 5, Nos. 84 – 107, was a new 40 caliber design intended for armored cruisers and battleship secondaries and constructed of tube, jacket, three hoops and one locking ring. This gun had a muzzle bell. Unfortunately, the Mark 5 proved to be unable to handle the transition from black powder to nitrocellulose propellants as the new propellant burned more slowly, which allowed pressure to build up to unsafe levels as the projectile traveled down the bore. This problem was illustrated when Colorado blew off the muzzle of one of her Mark 5 guns during gunnery practice off Yantai, Shandong, on 22 June 1907. All Mark 5 guns were subsequently removed from service by 1908, lengthened to 45 calibers by adding a new liner and rehooped to the muzzle, redesignated as Mod 1 and then placed into reserve. Two of these Mod 1 guns were given a slightly different breech mechanism and gas seat and then designated as Mod 2. Pennsylvania-class cruisers were subsequently rearmed with the stronger 8-in/45 caliber Mark 6 guns.

== Naval Service ==
Ship	Gun Installed	Gun Mount
USS Chicago (1885)	Mark 4: 8"/35 caliber (Nos. 69 – 72) refit 8"/30s in 1899	Mark 2: 4 × Single "Half-turret"
USS New York (ACR-2)	Mark 3: 8"/35 caliber (Nos. 16 – 21)	Mark 3 and Mark 4: 2 × Single center-pivots; Mark 5: 2 × Twin Turrets
USS Brooklyn (ACR-3)	Mark 4: 8"/35 caliber (Nos. 53 – 60)	Mark 8: 4 × Twin Turrets
USS Pennsylvania (ACR-4)	Mark 5: 8"/40 caliber	Mark 12: 2 × Twin Turrets
USS West Virginia (ACR-5)	Mark 5: 8"/40 caliber	Mark 12: 2 × Twin Turrets
USS California (ACR-6)	Mark 5: 8"/40 caliber	Mark 12: 2 × Twin Turrets
USS Colorado (ACR-7)	Mark 5: 8"/40 caliber	Mark 12: 2 × Twin Turrets
USS Maryland (ACR-8)	Mark 5: 8"/40 caliber	Mark 12: 2 × Twin Turrets
USS South Dakota (ACR-9)	Mark 5: 8"/40 caliber	Mark 12: 2 × Twin Turrets
USS Charleston (C-2)	Mark 3: 8"/35 caliber (Nos. 13 and 14)	Mark 3 and Mark 4: 2 × Single center-pivots
USS Baltimore (C-3)	Mark 4: 8"/35 caliber	Mark 3 and Mark 4: 4 × Single center-pivots
USS Olympia (C-6)	Mark 3: 8"/35 caliber (Nos. 34 – 37)	Mark 6: 2 × Twin Turrets
USS Columbia (C-12)	Mark 5: 8"/40 caliber (No. 33)	Mark 3 or Mark 4: 1 × Single center-pivot
USS Minneapolis (C-13)	Mark 5: 8"/40 caliber (No. 51)	Mark 3 or Mark 4: 1 × Single center-pivot
USS Indiana (BB-1)	Mark 4: 8"/35 caliber (Nos. 81 and 82 in 1906)	Mark 7: 4 × Twin Turrets
USS Massachusetts (BB-2)	Mark 4: 8"/35 caliber	Mark 7: 4 × Twin Turrets
USS Oregon (BB-3)	Mark 4: 8"/35 caliber	Mark 7: 4 × Twin Turrets
USS Iowa (BB-4)	Mark 4: 8"/35 caliber (Nos. 61 – 68) (No. 83 in 1908)	Mark 7: 4 × Twin Turrets
USS Kearsarge (BB-5)	Mark 4: 8"/35 caliber	Mark 9 (superimposed turret): 2 × Dual-Caliber Turret
USS Kentucky (BB-6)	Mark 4: 8"/35 caliber	Mark 9 (superimposed turret): 2 × Dual-Caliber Turret

== See also ==
- 8-inch gun M1888 - Army gun of similar type and era
