= Patrick McGunigal =

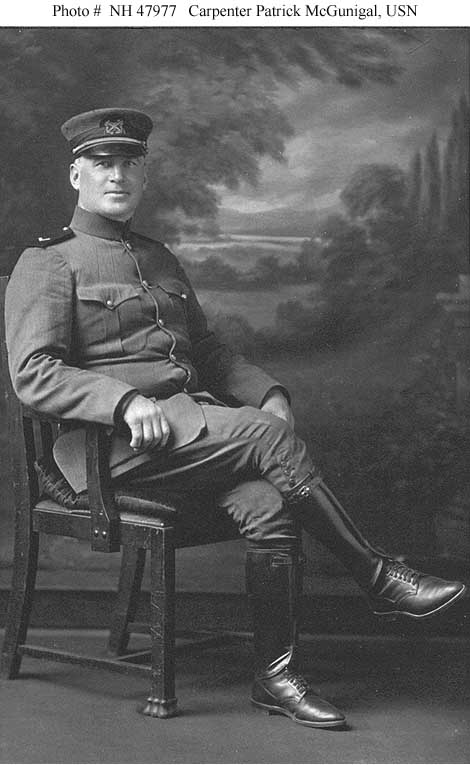
- Patrick McGunigal, Medal of Honor recipient
- Born: May 30, 1876; Hubbard, Ohio, US
- Died: January 19, 1936 (aged 59)
- Burial place: Arlington National Cemetery
- Military career
- Allegiance: United States
- Branch: United States Navy
- Service years: 1894 - 1920
- Rank: Warrant Officer
- Unit: USS Huntington
- Conflicts: World War I
- Awards: Medal of Honor

Patrick McGunigal (May 30, 1876 – January 19, 1936) was a sailor in the United States Navy who received the Medal of Honor for his actions during World War I.

== Biography ==
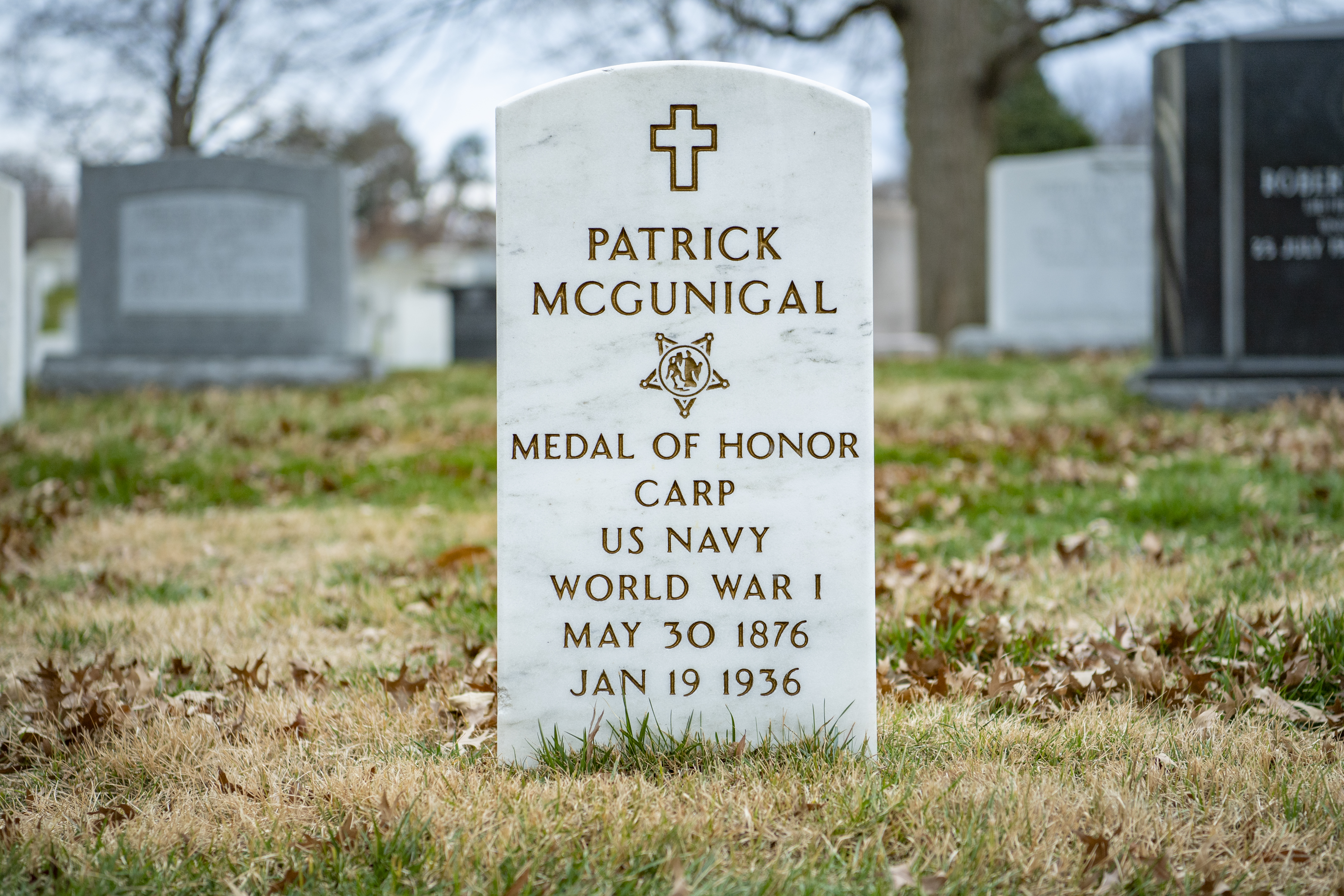
Grave at Arlington National Cemetery

McGunigal was born in Hubbard, Ohio on May 30, 1876, and joined the Navy in 1894. He was assigned as a Ship's Fitter First Class on board the armored cruiser USS Huntington at the time of his Medal of Honor action (see below) in 1917. He was promoted to the warrant officer rank of carpenter on July 20, 1918. He was subsequently assigned to the Naval Air Stations at Montauk and Rockaway Beach, New York. He retired from the Navy in December 1920.

McGunigal died on January 19, 1936, and was buried at Arlington National Cemetery. His grave can be found in section 6, lot 8674, map grid W/21.5.

== Medal of Honor citation ==
Rank and organization: Shipfitter First Class, U.S. Navy. Born: 30 May 1876, Hubbard, Ohio. Accredited to: Ohio. G.O. No.: 341, 1917.

Citation:

For extraordinary heroism while attached to the Huntington. On the morning of 17 September 1917, while the U.S.S. Huntington was passing through the war zone, a kite balloon was sent up with Lt. (j.g.) H. W. Hoyt, U.S. Navy, as observer. When the balloon was about 400 feet in the air, the temperature suddenly dropped, causing the balloon to descend about 200 feet, when it was struck by a squall. The balloon was hauled to the ship's side, but the basket trailed in the water and the pilot was submerged. McGunigal, with great daring, climbed down the side of the ship, jumped to the ropes leading to the basket, and cleared the tangle enough to get the pilot out of them. He then helped the pilot to get clear, put a bowline around him, and enabled him to be hauled to the deck. A bowline was lowered to McGunigal and he was taken safely aboard.

== See also ==
- List of Medal of Honor recipients
- List of Medal of Honor recipients for World War I
