= USS Maryland (ACR-8) =

Pennsylvania-class armored cruiser

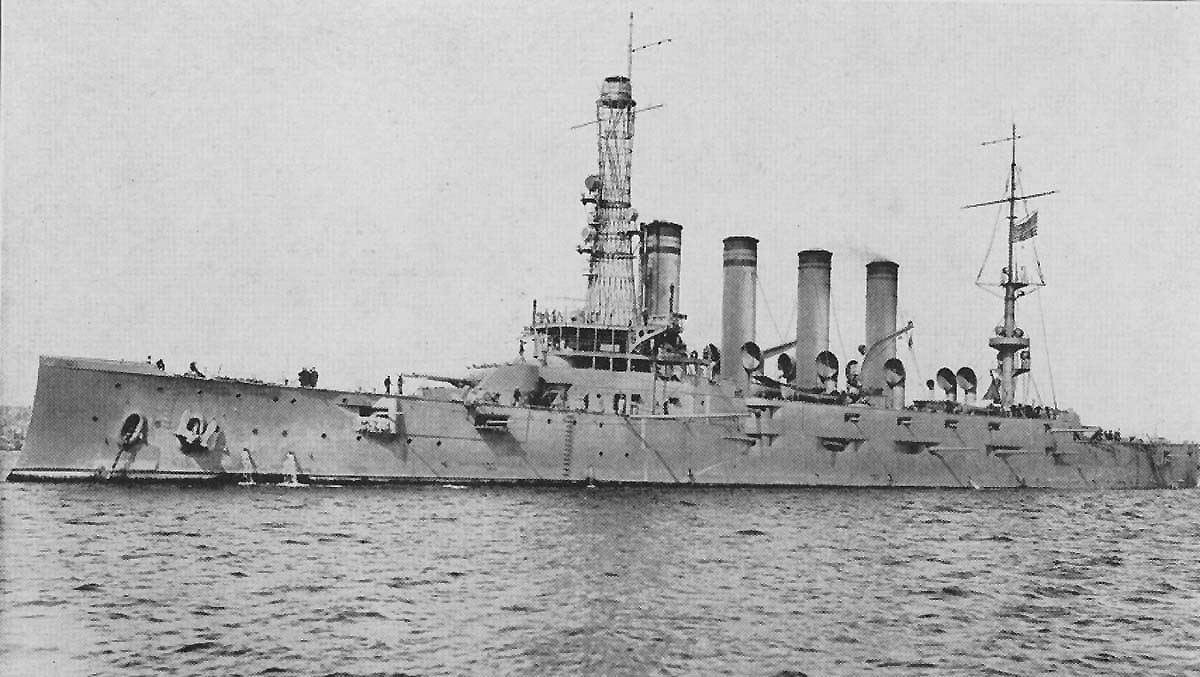
- USS Frederick (ACR-8), ex-USS Maryland, starboard view, 1919.

History

United States
- Name: Maryland
- Namesake: State of Maryland; City of Frederick, Maryland
- Ordered: 7 June 1900
- Builder: Newport News Drydock & ShipbuildingCo., Newport News, Virginia
- Cost: $3,775,000 (contract price of hull and machinery)
- Laid down: 29 October 1901
- Launched: 12 September 1903
- Sponsored by: Miss F. Pardee
- Commissioned: 18 April 1905
- Decommissioned: 14 February 1922
- Renamed: Frederick, 9 November 1916
- Reclassified: CA-8, 17 July 1920
- Stricken: 13 November 1929
- Identification: Hull symbol: ACR-8; Hull symbol: CA-8
- Fate: Sold for scrap, 11 February 1930

General characteristics (as built)
- Class & type: Pennsylvania-class armored cruiser
- Displacement: 13,680 long tons (13,900 t) (standard); 15,138 long tons (15,381 t) (full load)
- Length: 503 ft 11 in (153.59 m) oa; 502 ft (153 m) pp
- Beam: 69 ft 6 in (21.18 m)
- Draft: 24 ft 1 in (7.34 m) (mean)
- Installed power: 16 × Babcock & Wilcox boilers; 23,000 ihp (17,000 kW)
- Propulsion: 2 × vertical triple expansion reciprocating engines; 2 × screws
- Speed: 22 kn (41 km/h; 25 mph); 22.41 kn (41.50 km/h; 25.79 mph) (Speed on Trials)
- Complement: 80 officers 745 enlisted 64 Marines
- Armament: 4 × 8 in (203 mm)/40 caliber Mark 5 breech-loading rifles (BL)(2×2); 14 × 6 in (152 mm)/50 cal Mark 6 BL rifles; 18 × 3 in (76 mm)/50 cal rapid-fire guns; 12 × 3-pounder (47 mm (1.9 in)) Driggs-Schroeder guns; 2 × 1-pounder (37 mm (1.5 in)) Driggs-Schroeder saluting guns; 2 × 18 inch (450 mm) torpedo tubes
- Armor: Belt: 6 in (152 mm) (top & waterline); 5 in (127 mm) (bottom); Deck: 1 1/2 in (38 mm) - 6 in (amidships); 4 in (102 mm) (forward & aft); Barbettes: 6 in; Turrets: 6 - 6 1/2 in (165 mm); Conning Tower: 9 in (229 mm)

General characteristics (Pre-1911 Refit)
- Installed power: 8 × Modified Niclausse boilers, 12 × Babcock & Wilcox boilers
- Armament: 4 × 8 in/45 cal Mark 6 BL rifles (2×2); 14 × 6 in/50 cal Mark 6 BL rifles; 18 × 3 in/50 cal rapid-fire guns; 4 × 3-pounder (47 mm) Driggs-Schroeder saluting guns; 2 × 18 in submerged torpedo tubes

General characteristics (Pre-1921 Refit)
- Armament: 4 × 8 in/45 caliber Mark 6 BL rifles (2×2); 14 × 6 in/50 Mark 6 caliber BL rifles; 10 × 3 in/50 caliber rapid-fire guns; 2 × 3 in/50 caliber anti-aircraft guns; 4 × 3-pounder (47 mm) Driggs-Schroeder saluting guns; 2 × 18 in torpedo tubes

The second USS Maryland (ACR-8/CA-8), also referred to as "Armored Cruiser No. 8", and later renamed Frederick, was a United States Navy Pennsylvania-class armored cruiser.

She was laid down on 7 October 1901 by the Newport News Drydock & Shipbuilding Co., Newport News, Virginia, launched on 12 September 1903, sponsored by Miss Jennie Scott Waters; and commissioned on 18 April 1905, Captain Royal R. Ingersoll in command.

== Service history ==
=== Pre-World War I ===
In October 1905, following shakedown, Maryland joined the Atlantic Fleet for operations along the east coast and in the Caribbean, where she took part in the 1906 winter maneuvers off Cuba. The next summer, she conducted a training cruise for Massachusetts Naval Militiamen, and then readied for transfer to the Pacific. Departing Newport on 8 September 1906, she sailed – via San Francisco and Hawaii — for the Asiatic Station, where she remained until October 1907. She then returned to San Francisco and for the next decade she cruised throughout the Pacific, participating in survey missions to Alaska (1912 and 1913); carrying United States Secretary of State Knox to Tokyo for the funeral of Emperor Meiji Tenno (September 1912); steaming off the Central American coast to aid, if necessary, Americans endangered by political turmoil in Mexico and Nicaragua (1913, 1914, and 1916); and making numerous training cruises to Hawaii and the South-Central Pacific. Interestingly she was the recipient of torpedo damage, from a practice torpedo fired by USS Grampus (SS-4) on August 24, 1912. Maryland was performing maneuvers with both Grampus and USS Pike (SS-6) in one of the first documented simulated attacks by submarines on capital ships, as many believed that submarines were too slow, dirty, and fragile to be effective weapons. The practice torpedo, which was fitted with collapsible warhead to avoid damage, actually punctured Maryland's hull 9 feet below the waterline, causing enough flooding to take on a 5 degree list. The exercise required the Navy to rethink torpedo and submarine defenses for ships large than armored cruisers.

=== World War I ===
When the United States Congress declared war on Imperial Germany on 6 April 1917, the armored cruiser, renamed Frederick---in order to free up her original name for use with the Colorado-class battleship Maryland---on 9 November 1916, was en route from Puget Sound to San Francisco. Taking on men and supplies at the latter port, she got underway for the Atlantic. From May 1917 – January 1918, she patrolled the southeastern Atlantic off the coast of South America. On 1 February, she was assigned to escort duty in the North Atlantic, and until the signing of the Armistice, she convoyed troopships east of the 37th meridian. By 20 November, she was attached to the Cruiser and Destroyer Force, and before mid-1919 had completed six round trips returning troops from France. Detached from that duty, she entered the Philadelphia Navy Yard where she was briefly placed in reduced commission.

=== Inter-war period ===
Frederick crossed the Atlantic again, carrying the US Olympic Team to Antwerp, Belgium, as she conducted a naval reservist training cruise in July 1920. At the end of that year, she returned to the Pacific Fleet. Serving as flagship of the Train, Pacific Fleet, for the next year, she conducted only one lengthy cruise, to South America in March 1921. Operations off the west coast took up the remainder of her active duty career, and on 14 February 1922 she decommissioned and entered the Reserve Fleet at Mare Island. She was struck from the Naval Vessel Register on 13 November 1929 and sold on 11 February 1930.

In 1921, Frederick was used for several scenes in Harold Lloyd's first full-length film, the comedy A Sailor-Made Man. Camera (vol. 4, no. 29, p. 8) mentions a dinner party for the cast that was given by the officers of the ship.
