= Douglas Howard =

Douglas Howard may refer to:

- Douglas Sheffield, Baroness Sheffield (1542/43–1608), née Howard, English noblewoman
- Douglas Howard (diplomat) (1897–1987), British diplomat
- Douglas Legate Howard (1885–1936), American naval officer and coach of the United States Naval Academy football team
  - USS Douglas L. Howard
- Doug Howard (baseball), American baseball player
- Doug Howard (musician), American bassist, vocalist and songwriter
