= Porter Peak (Alaska) =

Mountain summit in Alaska, United States

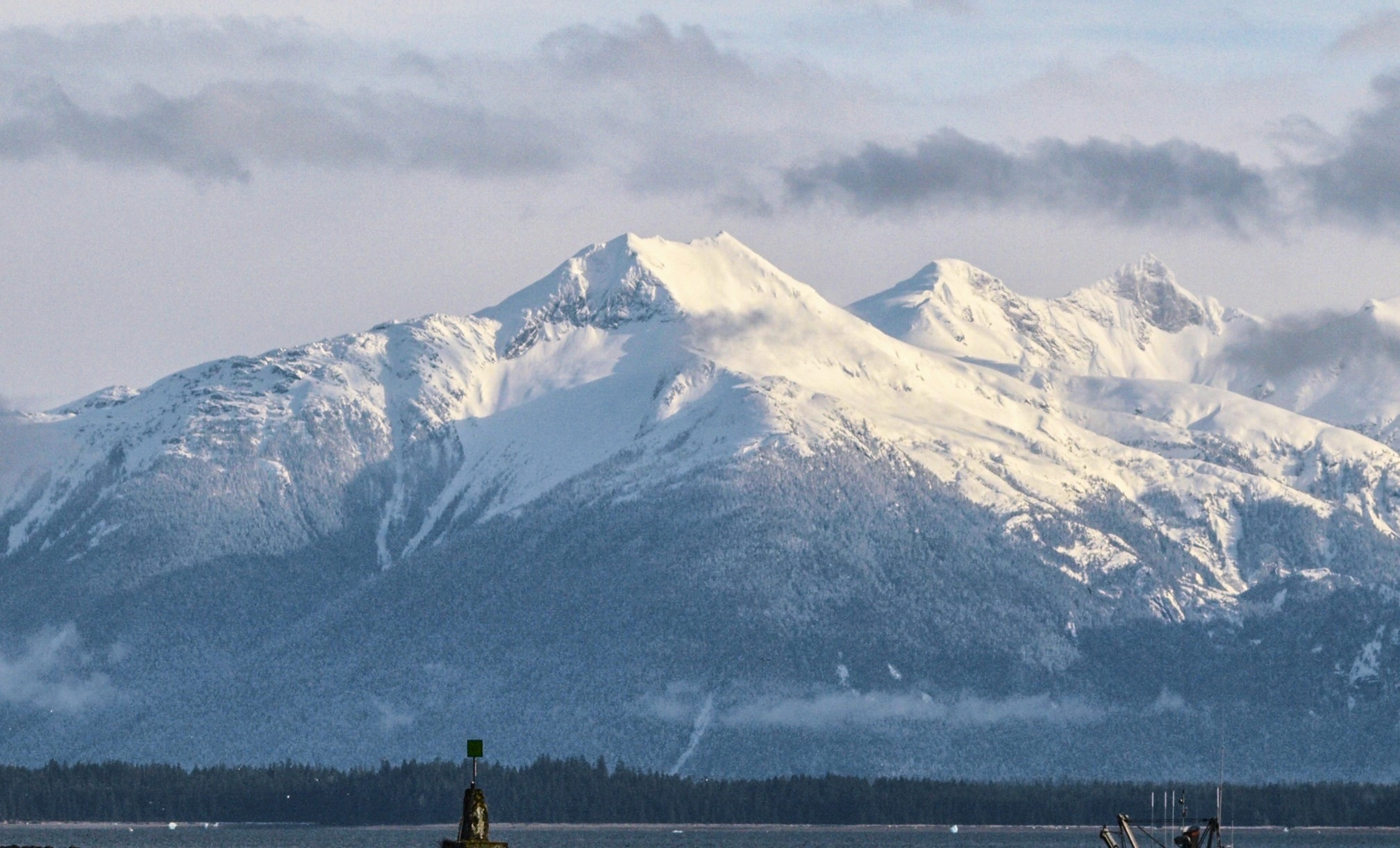
- Southwest aspect, centered (Foote Peak behind to right)

Highest point
- Elevation: 4,839 ft (1,475 m)
- Prominence: 886 ft (270 m)
- Parent peak: Foote Peak (5,150 ft)
- Isolation: 1.75 mi (2.82 km)
- Coordinates: 57°02′23″N 132°46′08″W

Geography
- Location within Alaska
- Interactive map of Porter Peak
- Country: United States
- State: Alaska
- Borough: Petersburg
- Protected area: Tongass National Forest
- Parent range: Coast Mountains; Boundary Ranges
- Topo map: USGS Sumdum A-3

Porter Peak is a 4,839-foot (1,475 m) mountain summit in Alaska.

== Description ==
Porter Peak is set in the Boundary Ranges of the Coast Mountains. It is located 17 miles (27 km) north-northeast of Petersburg on land managed by Tongass National Forest. Although modest in elevation, relief is significant as the mountain rises up from tidewater of Thomas Bay in less than two miles (3.2 km). The mountain's name was reported by the United States Coast and Geodetic Survey in 1964 and the toponym has been officially adopted by the United States Board on Geographic Names. Thomas Bay is named after Charles Mitchell Thomas who mapped this area in 1887 and named many of the surrounding mountains after prominent US Naval officers. He named nearby Foote Peak after Andrew Hull Foote, Jenkins Peak he named after Thornton A. Jenkins, Preble Peak for George Henry Preble, Bainbridge Peak after William Bainbridge, and Rodman Peak for Hugh Rodman. David Dixon Porter (1813–1891) was a US Navy admiral.

== Climate ==
Based on the Köppen climate classification, Porter Peak is located in a subpolar oceanic climate zone with cold, snowy winters, and mild summers. Weather systems coming off the Gulf of Alaska are forced upwards by the Coast Mountains (orographic lift), causing heavy precipitation in the form of rainfall and snowfall. Winter temperatures can drop below 0 °F with wind chill factors below −20 °F. This climate supports a small unnamed glacier on the mountain's north slope.

== See also ==
- List of mountain peaks of Alaska
- Geography of Alaska
