= Arthur Peak =

Mountain summit in Alaska, U.S.

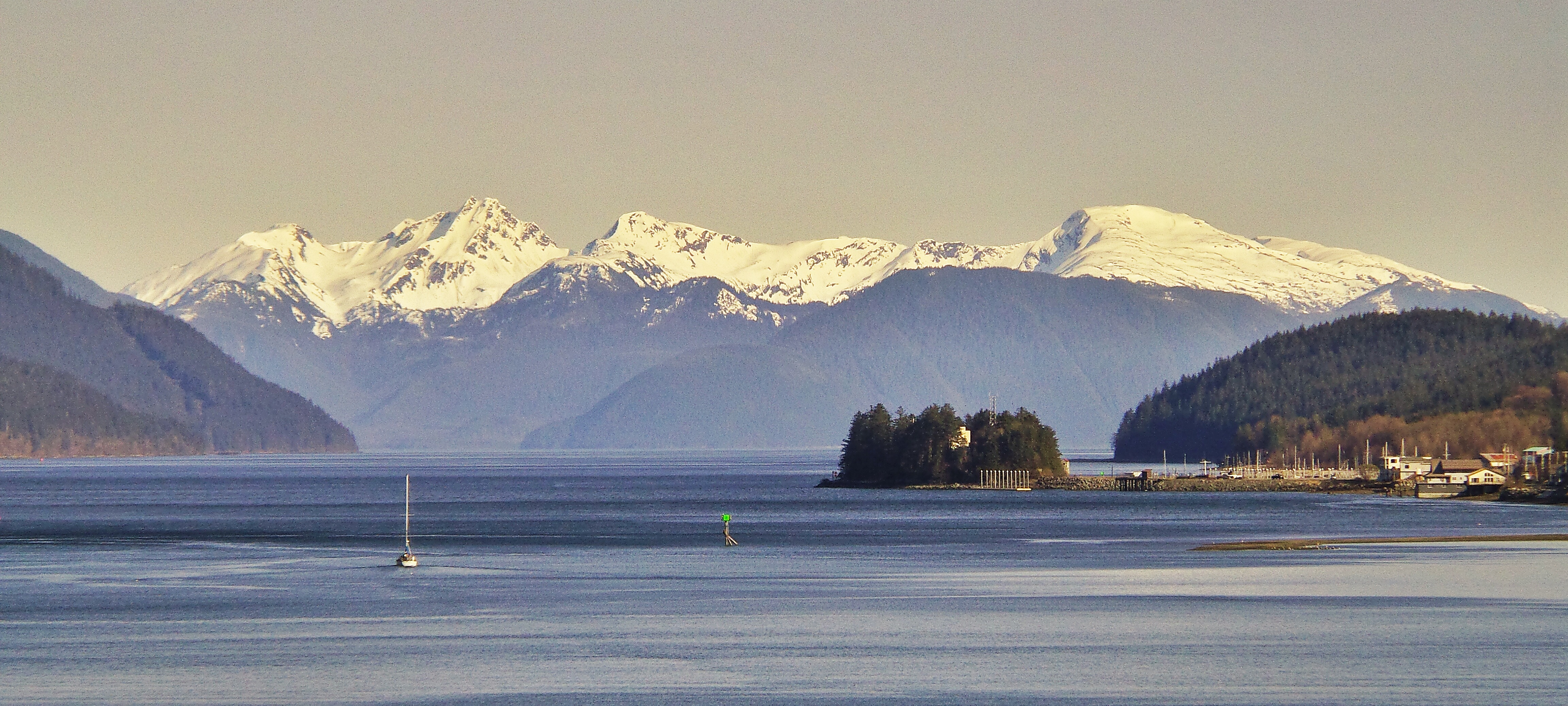
- Arthur Peak is the snow-capped mountain on right

Highest point
- Elevation: 3,650 ft (1,110 m)
- Prominence: 700 ft (210 m)
- Parent peak: Peak 3850
- Isolation: 1.84 mi (2.96 km)
- Coordinates: 58°03′09″N 133°58′33″W

Geography
- Location within Alaska
- Interactive map of Arthur Peak
- Location: Tongass National Forest; Juneau Borough; Alaska, United States
- Parent range: Boundary Ranges; Coast Mountains
- Topo map: USGS Taku River A-6

Arthur Peak is a 3,650-foot (1,113 m) elevation mountain summit located in the Coast Mountains in the U.S. state of Alaska. It is situated immediately east of Taku Harbor, and 25 mi (40 km) southeast of Juneau, on land managed by Tongass National Forest. Although modest in elevation, relief is significant since the peak rises up from tidewater of Limestone Inlet along Stephens Passage in 1.3 mi (2 km). Its nearest higher neighbor is Peak 3800, 1.85 mi (3 km) to the northeast. This geographic feature was named in 1888 by Lieutenant Commander C. M. Thomas of the U.S. Navy.

== Climate ==
Based on the Köppen climate classification, Arthur Peak has a subarctic climate with cold, snowy winters, and mild summers. Weather systems coming off the Gulf of Alaska are forced upwards by the Coast Mountains (orographic lift), causing heavy precipitation in the form of rainfall and snowfall. Temperatures can drop below −20 °C with wind chill factors below −30 °C. The month of July offers the most favorable weather for viewing and climbing Arthur Peak.

== Gallery ==
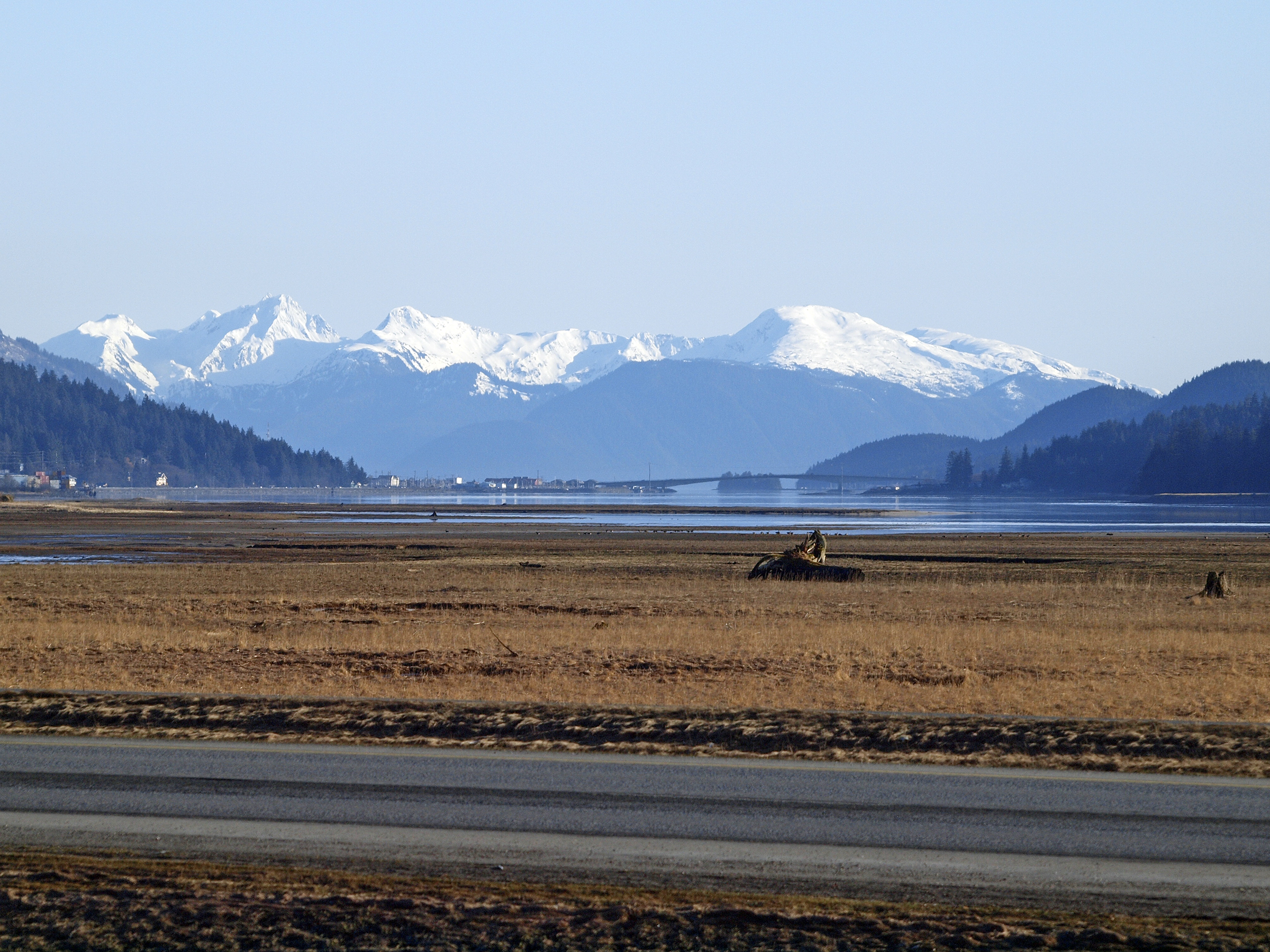
Arthur Peak right of center, with Peak 3850 to left

== See also ==
- List of mountain peaks of Alaska
- Geography of Alaska
