= Thomas B. Howard =

Thomas Benton Howard
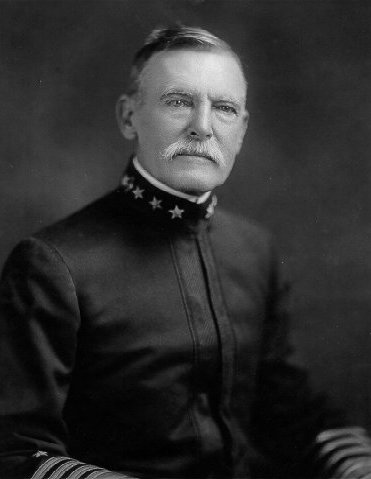
- Born: August 10, 1854; Galena, Illinois, U.S.
- Died: November 10, 1920 (aged 66); Annapolis, Maryland, U.S.
- Spouse: Ann Jacob Claude
- Children: Douglas Legate Howard
- Military career
- Allegiance: United States
- Branch: United States Navy
- Service years: 1873–1916
- Rank: Admiral
- Nickname: "Ben"
- Commands: Chesapeake; Nevada; Olympia; Tennessee; Ohio; U.S. Pacific Fleet
- Conflicts: Spanish–American War; Mexican Revolution

Thomas Benton Howard (August 10, 1854 – November 10, 1920) was a United States Navy officer who served as commander in chief of the U.S. Pacific Fleet prior to United States' entry into World War I.

== Early life and education ==
Howard was born in Galena, Illinois, in 1854 and was educated in the public schools. In 1868, through President Ulysses S. Grant, who spent the summer of that year in Galena, he was appointed to the US Naval Academy. Grant knew Howard's father well and his wife and Howard's mother were also friends when both lived in St. Louis.

Howard came from a military family, as his father, Bushrod Brush Howard, was a captain in the Mexican War. Bushrod Howard, in the early days of the Civil War, commanded Company I, 19th Illinois Infantry Regiment and was killed along with more than one hundred other men of the regiment in a railroad accident at Beaver Creek Bridge on the Ohio and Mississippi Railroad. Howard's mother was Elizabeth Mackay Howard, daughter of Helen and Aeneas Mackay, a United States Army officer stationed at Jefferson Barracks, St. Louis, as was also her maternal grandfather, Captain Thomas Legate. Captain Legate moved to Galena, Illinois in 1828 as Superintendent of the lead mines.

== Career ==
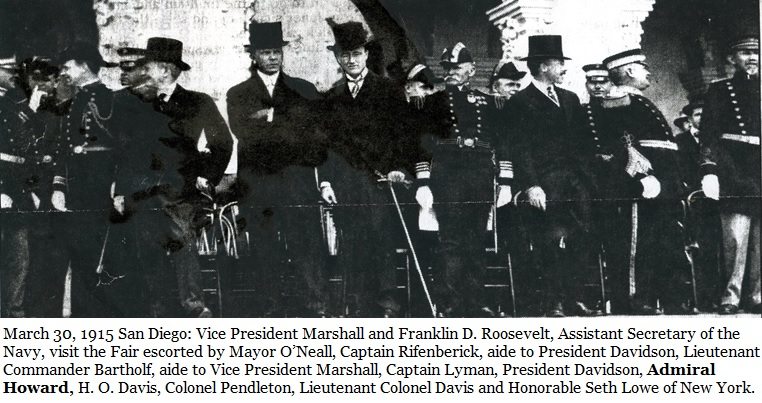
Howard with Franklin D. Roosevelt

As a cadet in the academy, Howard was often, by special invitation, a guest at the White House, and was usually appointed Grant's aide whenever the President visited Annapolis. Howard graduated at the top of his class in 1873 and was promoted to ensign in 1874. During his career he served under George Dewey at the Battle of Manila Bay and successively commanded Chesapeake, Nevada, Olympia, Tennessee, and Ohio. As captain of Ohio, he sailed around the world with the Great White Fleet in 1908–1909.

In January 1914, Howard was appointed commander in chief of the U.S. Pacific Fleet. When the Marines established camp for the second time on San Diego's North Island, they named it Camp Howard, in his honor. In 1915, he became the fifth full admiral in the history of the U.S. Navy when the three commanders in chief of the Atlantic, Pacific, and Asiatic Fleets were each advanced to the temporary rank of full admiral. Upon relinquishing command of the Pacific Fleet in September 1915, Howard reverted to his permanent rank of rear admiral.

=== Dates of rank ===
- Midshipman – 31 May 1873
- Ensign – 16 July 1874
- Master – 13 January 1879
- Junior lieutenant – 3 March 1883
- Lieutenant – 7 November 1885
- Lieutenant commander – 3 March 1899
- Commander – unknown
- Captain – unknown
- Rear admiral – 14 November 1910
- Admiral – March 1915

== Later life and death ==
Howard retired on August 10, 1916. He was Superintendent of the US Naval Observatory from March 31, 1917 to March 4, 1919. He died in Annapolis, Maryland on November 10, 1920.

== Personal life ==
Howard is the father of Captain Douglas Legate Howard and great-grandfather of Vice Admiral Henry C. Mustin and second great-grandfather of Vice Admiral John Mustin.

Preceded by Walter C. Cowles	Commander-in-Chief of the United States Pacific Fleet; January 1914 – September 1915	Succeeded by Cameron M. Winslow
