= Great White Fleet =

Circumnavigation by US fleet (1907–09)

- Map of the Great White Fleet's voyage (2009 political boundaries shown)
- Date: December 16, 1907 – February 22, 1909
- Cause: Diplomacy
- Organised by: Theodore Roosevelt
- Participants: United States Navy
- Website: www.history.navy.mil/research/histories/ship-histories/the-great-white-fleet.html

The Great White Fleet was the popular nickname for the group of United States Navy battleships that completed a journey around the globe from 16 December 1907 to 22 February 1909 by order of President Theodore Roosevelt. It consisted of 16 battleships divided into two squadrons, along with various small escorts, and earned its moniker for the stark white paint on its hulls.

The fleet's primary mission was to make friendly courtesy visits to numerous countries while displaying new U.S. naval power to the world; Roosevelt sought to demonstrate growing American military prowess and blue-water naval capabilities. Another goal was to deter a threatened war with Japan amid growing tensions around 1907. The voyage helped familiarize the 14,500 officers and sailors with the logistical and planning needs for extended fleet action far from home.

After long neglecting the Navy, Congress started generous appropriations in the 1880s, a plan set in motion initially by President Chester Arthur. Beginning with just 90 small ships, over one-third of them wooden and obsolete, the Navy quickly added new steel fighting vessels. The fleet's capital ships were already obsolete compared to the British dreadnoughts in 1907. Nevertheless, it was by far the largest and most powerful fleet that had ever circled the globe; the mission was a success at home and in every country that was visited, including in Europe (which was visited only briefly).

== Background and purpose ==
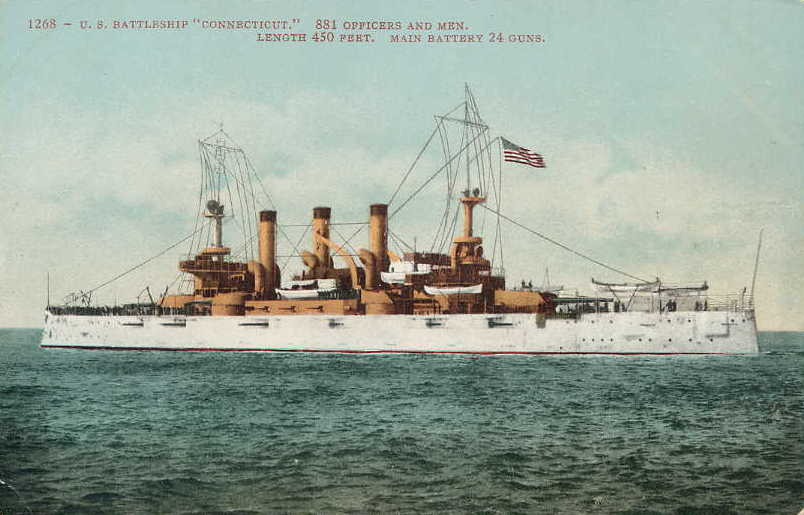
Flagship Connecticut: one of a set of commemorative postcards of the ships of the Great White Fleet

United States President Theodore Roosevelt dispatched 16 U.S. Navy battleships of the Atlantic Fleet on a worldwide voyage of circumnavigation from 16 December 1907 to 22 February 1909. The hulls were painted white, the Navy's peacetime color scheme, and decorated with gilded scrollwork with a red, white, and blue banner on their bows. The superstructures were painted buff. These ships later came to be known as the Great White Fleet.

The purpose of the fleet deployment was multifaceted. Ostensibly, it served as a showpiece of American goodwill, as the fleet visited numerous countries and harbors. In this, the voyage was not unprecedented. Naval courtesy calls, many times in conjunction with the birthdays of various monarchs and other foreign celebrations, had become common in the 19th century. Port calls showcased pomp, ceremony, and militarism during a period of rising prewar nationalism. In 1891, a large French Navy fleet visited Kronstadt, Russia, in conjunction with negotiations between the two nations. Although France and Russia had been hostile to each other for at least three decades prior, the significance of the call was not lost on Russia, and Tsar Nicholas II signed a treaty of alliance with France in 1894. As navies grew larger, naval pageants grew longer, more elaborate, and more frequent. The United States began participating in these events in 1902, when Roosevelt invited Kaiser Wilhelm II of Germany to send a squadron for a courtesy call to New York City. Invitations for U.S. Navy ships to participate in fleet celebrations in the United Kingdom, France, and Germany followed.

Additionally, the voyage of the Great White Fleet demonstrated both at home and on the world stage that the U.S. had become a major sea power in the years after its triumph in the Spanish–American War, with possessions that included Guam, the Philippines, and Puerto Rico. This was not the first demonstration of U.S. naval power; during the Algeciras Conference in 1906, which was convened to settle a diplomatic crisis between France and Germany over the fate of Morocco, Roosevelt had ordered eight battleships to maintain a presence in the Mediterranean Sea. Since Japan had arisen as a major sea power with the 1905 annihilation of the Russian fleet at Tsushima, the deployment of the Great White Fleet was therefore intended, at least in part, to send a message to Japan that the American fleet could be deployed anywhere, even from its Atlantic ports, and would be able to defend American interests in the Philippines and the Pacific.

The most serious tensions between the United States and Japan came in 1907, leading to widespread speculation among experts that war was imminent between the two. The main cause was intense Japanese resentment against the mistreatment of Japanese Americans in California. Pulitzer prize-winning biographer Henry Pringle states that sending Great White Fleet so dramatically to Japan in 1908 was, "the direct result of the Japanese trouble." Tensions rapidly de-escalated after the fleet's very friendly reception in Yokohama. Thus, the gesture neutralized the diplomatic trouble that had resulted from anti-Japanese riots in San Francisco. Those problems had been resolved by the Gentlemen's Agreement of 1907 and the fleet visit was a friendly gesture to Japan. The Japanese welcomed it. Roosevelt saw the deployment as one that would encourage patriotism, and give the impression that he would teach Japan "a lesson in polite behavior", as historian Robert A. Hart phrased it. After the fleet had crossed the Pacific, Japanese statesmen realized that the balance of power in the East had changed.

The voyage also provided an opportunity to improve the sea- and battle-worthiness of the fleet. While earlier capital-ship classes such as the Kearsarge, Illinois and Maine were designed primarily for coastal defense, later classes such as the Virginia and Connecticut incorporated lessons learned from the Spanish–American War and were conceived as ships with "the highest practicable speed and the greatest radius of action", in the words of the appropriation bills approved by the United States Congress for their construction. They were intended as modern warships capable of long-range operations. Nevertheless, the experience gained in the recent war with Spain had been limited.

== Concerns and preparations ==
Roosevelt's stated intent was to give the Navy practice in navigation, communication, coal consumption, and fleet maneuvering; Navy professionals maintained, however, that such matters could be served better in home waters. In light of what had happened to the Russian Baltic Fleet, they were concerned about sending their own fleet on a long deployment, especially since part of the intent was to impress a modern, battle-tested navy that had not known defeat. The fleet was untested in making such a voyage, and Tsushima had proven that extended deployments had no place in practical strategy. The Japanese Navy was close to coaling and repair facilities; while American ships could coal in the Philippines, docking facilities were far from optimal. An extended stop on the West Coast of the United States during the voyage for overhaul and refurbishment in dry dock would be a necessity. Planning for the voyage, however, showed a dearth of adequate facilities there, as well. The main sea channel of the Mare Island Naval Shipyard near San Francisco was too shallow for battleships, which left only the Puget Sound Navy Yard in Bremerton, Washington, for refit and repair. The Hunter's Point civilian yard in San Francisco could accommodate capital ships, but had been closed due to lack of use and was slated for demolition. Roosevelt ordered that Hunter's Point be reopened, facilities be brought up to date, and the fleet to report there.

Also, the question of adequate resources for coaling existed. This was not an issue when the Atlantic Fleet cruised the Atlantic or Caribbean, as fuel supplies were readily available. However, the United States did not enjoy a worldwide network of coaling stations like that of Great Britain, nor did it have an adequate supply of auxiliary vessels for resupply. During the Spanish–American War, this lack had forced Admiral George Dewey to buy a collier-load of British coal in Hong Kong before the Battle of Manila Bay to ensure his squadron would not run out of steam at sea. The need had been even more pressing for the Russian Baltic Fleet during its long deployment during the Russo-Japanese War, not just for the distance it was to steam, but also because, as a belligerent nation in wartime, most neutral ports were closed to it due to international law. While the lack of support vessels was pointed out and a vigorous program of building such ships suggested by Rear Admiral George W. Melville, who had served as chief of the Bureau of Equipment, his words were not heeded adequately until World War II.

Federal regulations that restricted supply vessels for Navy ships to those flying the United States flag, complicated by the lack of an adequate United States Merchant Marine, proved another obstacle. Roosevelt initially offered to award Navy supply contracts to American skippers whose bids exceeded those of foreign captains by less than 50%. Many carriers declined this offer because they could not obtain enough cargo to cover the cost of the return trip. Two months before the fleet sailed, Roosevelt ordered the United States Department of the Navy to contract 38 ships to supply the fleet with the 125,000 tons of coal it would need to steam from Hampton Roads, Virginia, to San Francisco. Only eight of these were American-registered; most of the other 30 were of British registry. This development was potentially awkward, since part of the mission was to impress Japan with the perception of overwhelming American naval power. Britain had become a military ally of Japan in 1902 with the Anglo-Japanese Alliance, which obliged it to aid Japan should a foreign power declare war against it. Technically, the list of potential combatants included the United States. The British government decided to play both sides of the political fence with the intent of moderating any Japanese-American friction that might arise.

Prior to the ships’ departure, Congress raised concerns about funding. According to the Naval Historical Center, Maine Senator Eugene Hale made his intention known to withhold funding for the effort. Roosevelt's response was that if Congress was unwilling to fund the trip, he already had the funds to send the fleet out into the Pacific. If Congress wanted the fleet to return home, though, they would have to fund the other half of the trip. As noted by Roosevelt biographer Edmund Morris, the President would not be deterred. He stated "I am Commander-in-Chief, and my decision is absolute in the matter."

== Voyage ==
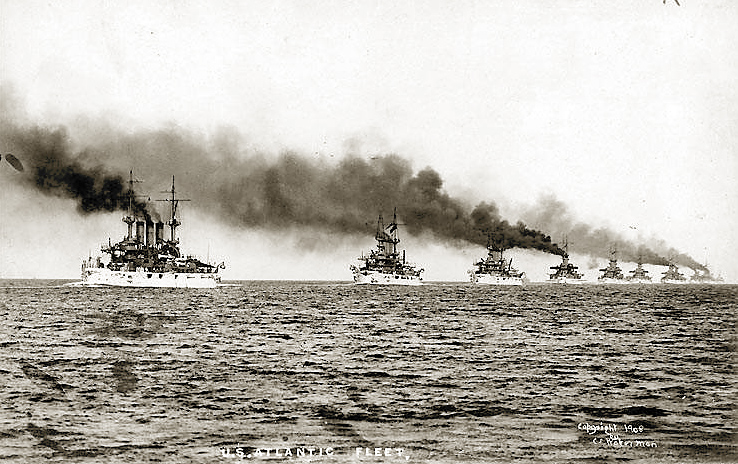
Kansas sails ahead of Vermont as the fleet leaves Hampton Roads, Virginia, on 16 December 1907.

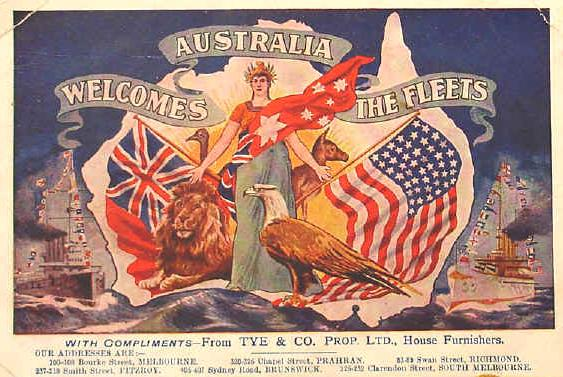
A 1908 postcard welcomes the fleet to Australia.

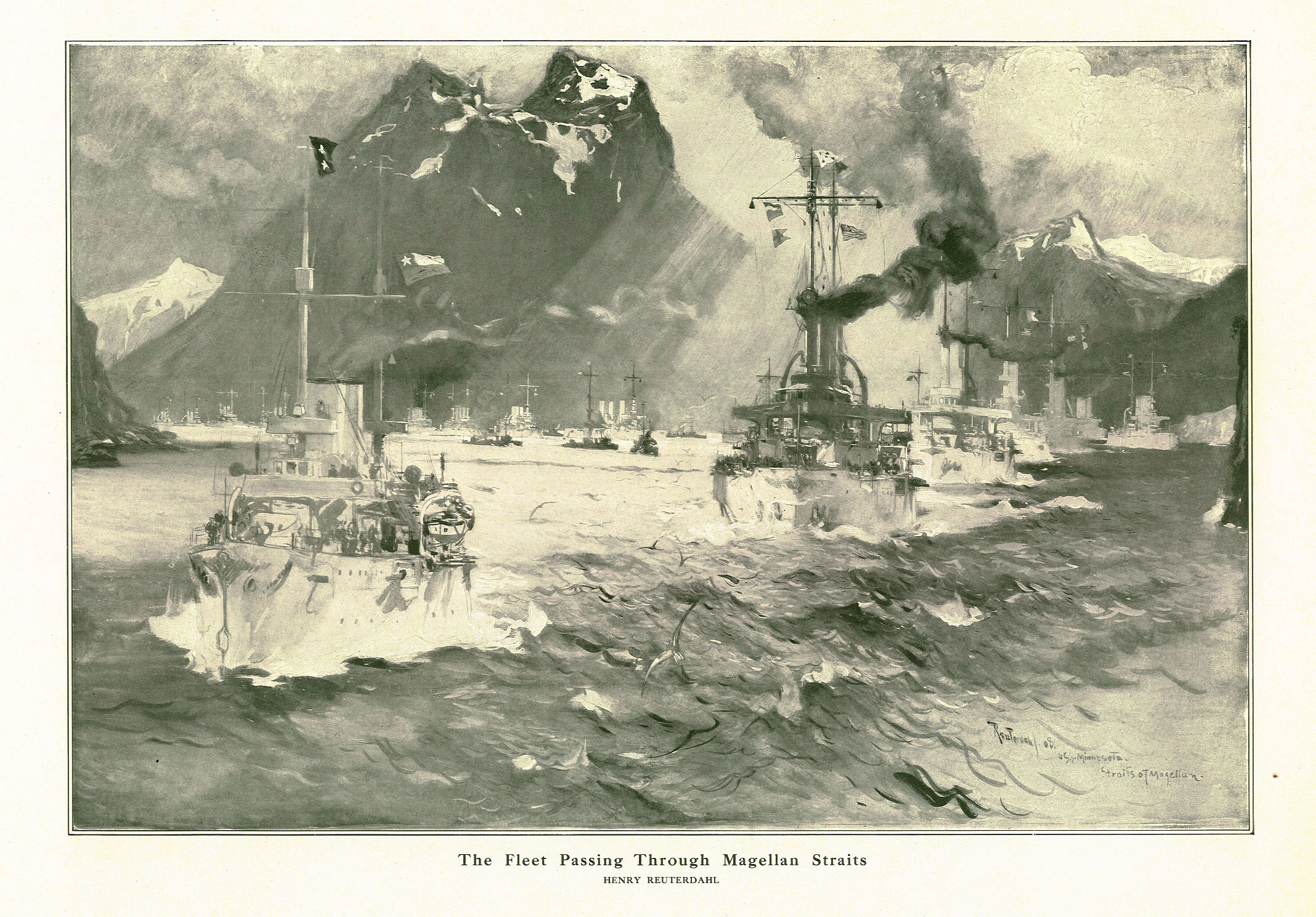
The Fleet Passing Through the Magellan Straits by naval artist Henry Reuterdahl, who traveled with the fleet on USS Culgoa

The Great White Fleet's journey began with its display at the Jamestown Exposition in Hampton Roads, Virginia, marking the 300th anniversary of the founding of Jamestown. As the Panama Canal was not yet complete, the fleet had to pass through the Straits of Magellan. The scope of such an operation was unprecedented in U.S. history, as ships had to sail from all points of the compass to rendezvous points and proceed according to a carefully orchestrated, well-conceived plan. It involved almost the entire operational capability of the U.S. Navy. During the crossing of the Straits of Magellan, the U.S. ships were escorted by the Chilean Navy cruiser, Chacabuco.

Unlike the formidable obstacles that had faced the Russian fleet (Note: The Russian fleet had no coaling stations and foreign coaling stations were off limits to them during their voyage. The fleet had to refuel at sea via German contractor coaling vessels or on the sly at French ports. (Busch 1969, pp. 86, 87)) on its voyage from the Baltic to the Pacific, which eventually led to its destruction by the Japanese in 1905, the U.S. effort benefited from a peaceful environment, which aided the coordination of ship movements.

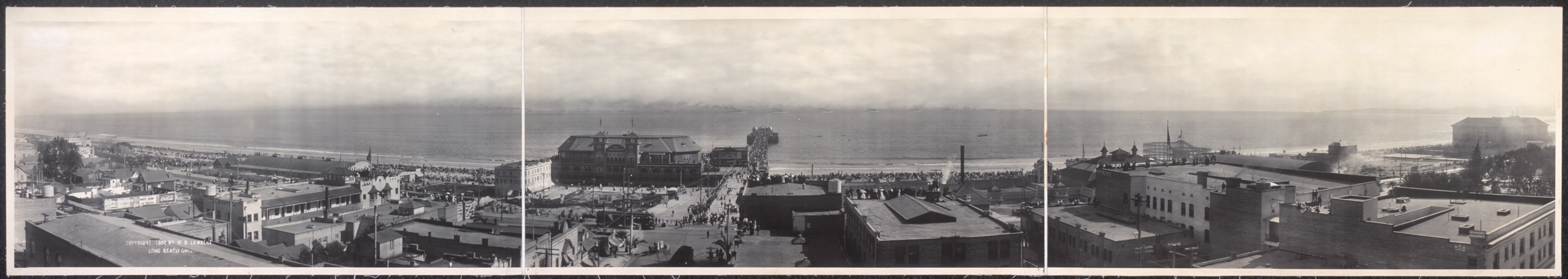
A crowd observes the fleet off the coast of Long Beach, California, 1908

After taking nearly four months to round South America, the fleet made several stops in American waters on the Pacific Ocean. In port after port, thousands of citizens turned out to see and greet the fleet. In April 1908, 16 battleships anchored off of Coronado, California, in the San Diego area, and thousands of sailors and marines took part in a parade through San Diego's streets. The fleet also stopped in Los Angeles and Santa Barbara. In May 1908, the fleet visited Monterey, California; the nearby Hotel Del Monte in Del Monte, California, hosted a grand ball for the officers of the fleet. After arriving in San Francisco on 6 May, most of the fleet took a side trip to Seattle and Tacoma, then returned to San Francisco.

On 7 July, the entire fleet left San Francisco for Honolulu, New Zealand, and Australia. In Australia, the arrival of the Great White Fleet on 20 August 1908 was used to encourage support for the forming of Australia's own navy. In Sicily, sailors helped in recovery operations after the 1908 Messina earthquake.

== Fleet composition ==
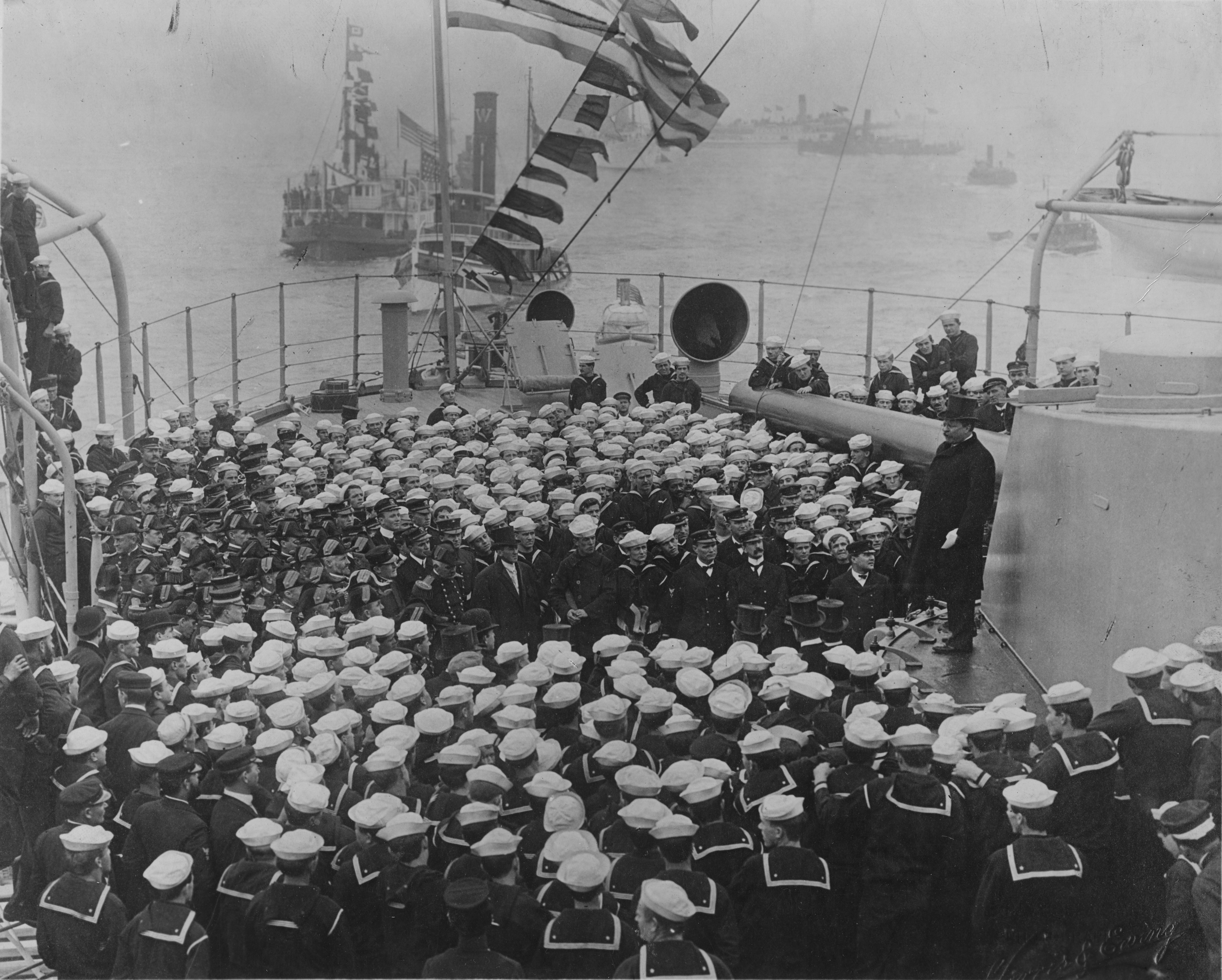
President Theodore Roosevelt, (on gun turret, right) addressing officers and crew on Connecticut, in Hampton Roads, Virginia, 22 February 1909

The 14-month-long voyage was intended to be a grand pageant of American naval power. The squadrons were manned by 14,000 sailors. They covered some 43,000 nautical miles (80,000 km) and made 20 port calls on six continents. The fleet was impressive, especially as a demonstration of American industrial prowess (all 18 ships had been constructed since the Spanish–American War), but already the battleships represented the suddenly outdated predreadnought type of capital ship, as the first battleships of the revolutionary Dreadnought class had just entered service, and the U.S. Navy's first dreadnought, South Carolina, was already fitting out. The two oldest ships in the fleet, Kearsarge and Kentucky, were already obsolete and unfit for battle; two others, Maine and Alabama, had to be detached at San Francisco because of mechanical troubles and were replaced by the Nebraska and the Wisconsin. After repairs, Alabama and Maine completed their "own, more direct, circumnavigation of the globe" via Honolulu, Guam, Manila, Singapore, Colombo, Suez, Naples, Gibraltar, the Azores, and finally back to the United States, arriving on 20 October 1908, four months before the remainder of the fleet, which had taken a more circuitous route.

The battleships were accompanied during the first leg of their voyage by a "Torpedo Flotilla" of six early destroyers, and by several auxiliary ships. The destroyers and their tender did not actually steam in company with the battleships, but followed their own itinerary from Hampton Roads to San Francisco, California. Also, the armored cruiser Washington preceded the fleet itinerary for its first and second legs by about a month, perhaps making arrangements to later receive the fleet.

== General fleet itinerary ==
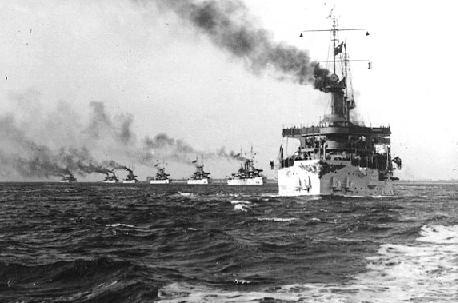
Connecticut leading the Great White Fleet, 1907

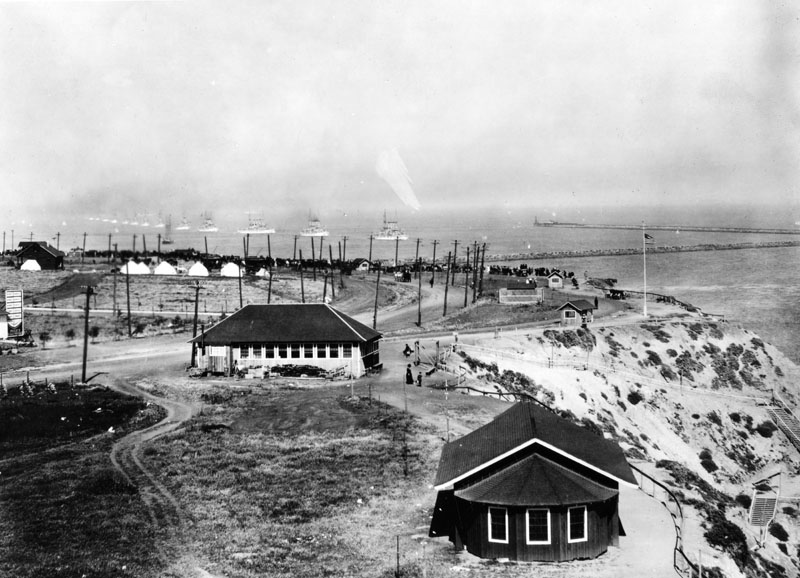
The Great White Fleet arriving at the Port of Los Angeles in the San Pedro Bay, 1908

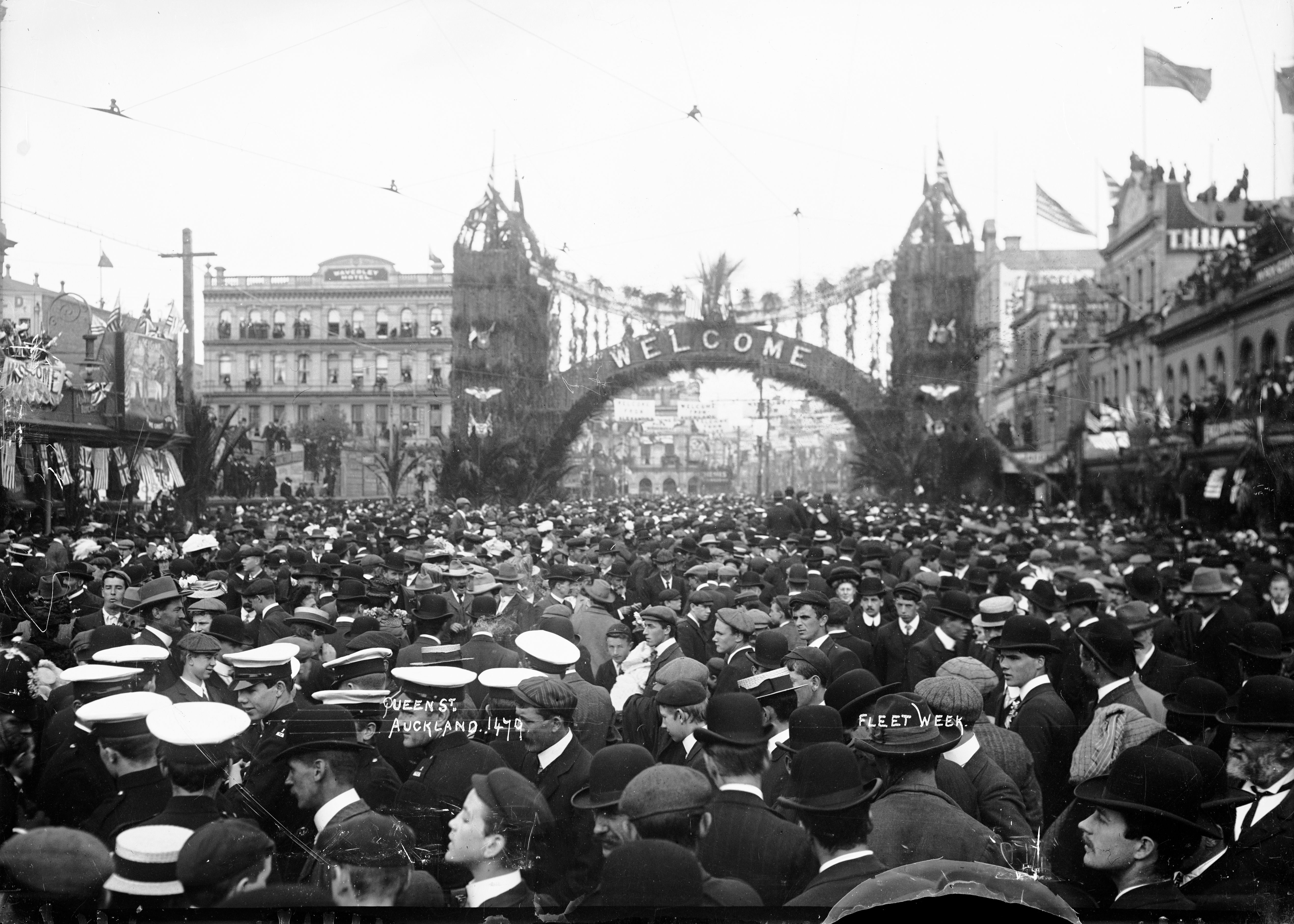
Fleet Week celebrations in Auckland, New Zealand

With Connecticut as flagship under the command of Rear Admiral Robley D. Evans, the fleet sailed from Hampton Roads on 16 December 1907 for Trinidad, British West Indies, thence to Rio de Janeiro, Brazil; Punta Arenas, Chile; Callao, Peru; Magdalena Bay, Mexico, and north along the West Coast, arriving at San Francisco on 6 May 1908.

At San Francisco, Rear Admiral Charles S. Sperry assumed command of the fleet, owing to the poor health of Admiral Evans. Also at San Francisco, the squadrons were slightly rearranged, bringing the newest and best ships in the fleet up to the First Squadron. Glacier was detached and later became the supply ship of the Pacific Fleet. At this time also, Nebraska, under Captain Reginald F. Nicholson, and Wisconsin, under Captain Frank E. Beatty, were substituted for Maine and Alabama. In San Francisco, Minnesota was brought forward into First Squadron, First Division, and Louisiana took her place as flagship, Second Squadron.

Leaving that port on 7 July 1908 the U.S. Atlantic Fleet visited Honolulu; Auckland, New Zealand; Sydney, Melbourne, and Albany, Australia; Manila, Philippines; Yokohama, Japan; and Colombo, Ceylon; then arriving at Suez, Egypt, on 3 January 1909.

While the fleet was in Egypt, word was received of an earthquake in Sicily, thus affording an opportunity for the United States to show its friendship to Italy by offering aid to its victims. Connecticut, Illinois, Culgoa, and Yankton were dispatched to Messina, Italy, at once. The crew of Illinois recovered the bodies of the American consul, Arthur S. Cheney, and his wife, entombed in the ruins. Scorpion, the fleet's station ship at Constantinople, and Celtic, a refrigerator ship fitted out in New York, were hurried to Messina, relieving Connecticut and Illinois, so that they could continue on the cruise.

Leaving Messina on 9 January 1909, the fleet stopped at Naples, Italy, thence to Gibraltar, arriving at Hampton Roads on 22 February 1909. There, President Roosevelt reviewed the fleet as it passed into the roadstead.

== First leg ==
From Hampton Roads to San Francisco, 14,556 nautical miles (26,958 km).

=== Itinerary ===
Port	Arrival	Departure	To next port	
Port	Arrival	Departure	distance	days
Hampton Roads, Virginia		16 December 1907	1,803 nmi (3,339 km)	8
Port of Spain, Trinidad	23 December 1907	29 December 1907	3,399 nmi (6,295 km)	15
Rio de Janeiro, Brazil	12 January 1908	21 January 1908	2,374 nmi (4,397 km)	12
Punta Arenas, Chile	1 February 1908	7 February 1908	2,838 nmi (5,256 km)	14
Callao, Peru	20 February 1908	29 February 1908	3,010 nmi (5,570 km)	13
Magdalena Bay, Mexico	12 March 1908	11 April 1908	1,132 nmi (2,096 km)	26
San Francisco, California	6 May 1908			

=== Ships ===
The Fleet, First Squadron and First Division, were commanded by Rear Admiral Robley D. Evans. First Division consisted of four ships of the 1906 Connecticut class: Connecticut, the fleet's flagship, Captain Hugo Osterhaus; Kansas, Captain Charles E. Vreeland; Vermont, Captain William P. Potter; and Louisiana, Captain Richard Wainwright.

Second Division was commanded by Rear Admiral William H. Emory. Second Division consisted of four ships of the 1904 Virginia class: Georgia, the division flagship, Captain Henry McCrea; New Jersey, Captain William H. H. Southerland; Rhode Island, Captain Joseph B. Murdock; and Virginia, Captain Seaton Schroeder.

Second Squadron and Third Division were commanded by Rear Admiral Charles M. Thomas. Third Division consisted of one Connecticut-class ship and the three ships of the 1902 Maine class: Minnesota, the squadron flagship, Captain John Hubbard; Maine, Captain Giles B. Harber; Missouri, Captain Greenlief A. Merriam; and Ohio, Captain Charles W. Bartlett.

Fourth Division was commanded by Rear Admiral Charles S. Sperry. Fourth Division consisted of two ships of the 1901 Illinois class and the two 1900 Kearsarge class ships: Alabama, the division flagship, Captain Ten Eyck De Witt Veeder; Illinois, Captain John M. Bowyer, Kearsarge, Captain Hamilton Hutchins; and Kentucky, Captain Walter C. Cowles.

The fleet auxiliaries consisted of Culgoa (a storeship), Lieutenant Commander John B. Patton; Glacier (a storeship), Commander William S. Hogg; Panther (a repair ship), Commander Valentine S. Nelson; Yankton (a tender), Lieutenant Walter R. Gherardi; and Relief (a hospital ship).

The "Torpedo Flotilla" of destroyers consisted of Hopkins, Lieutenant Alfred G. Howe; Stewart, Lieutenant Julius F. Hellweg; Hull, Lieutenant Frank McCommon; Truxton, Lieutenant Charles S. Kerrick; Lawrence, Lieutenant Ernest Friedrick; Whipple, Lieutenant Hutch I. Cone; and Arethusa (a tender), Commander Albert W. Grant.

== Second leg ==
=== Itinerary ===
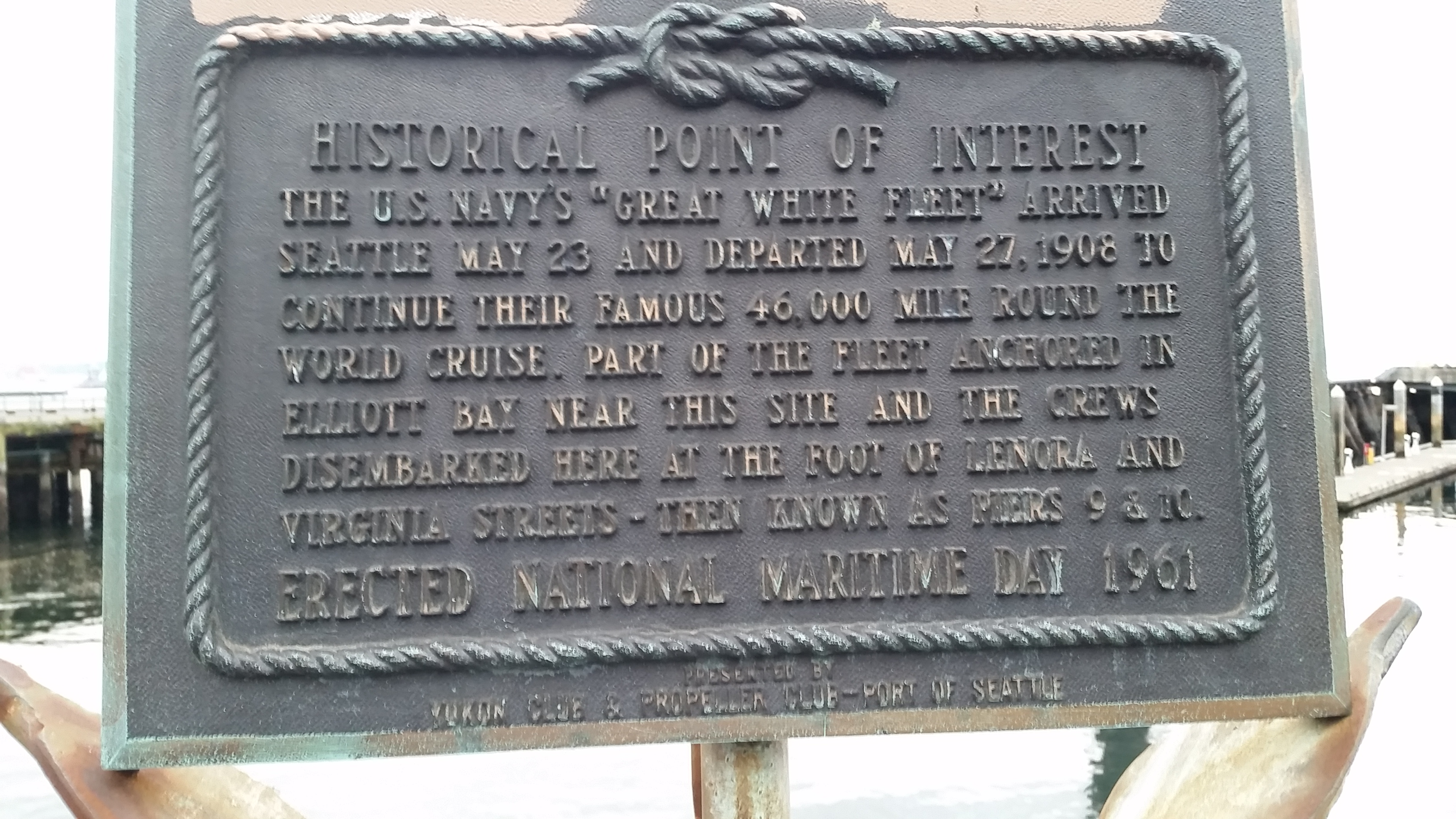
Historical marker in Seattle that notes the 1908 arrival of the Fleet.

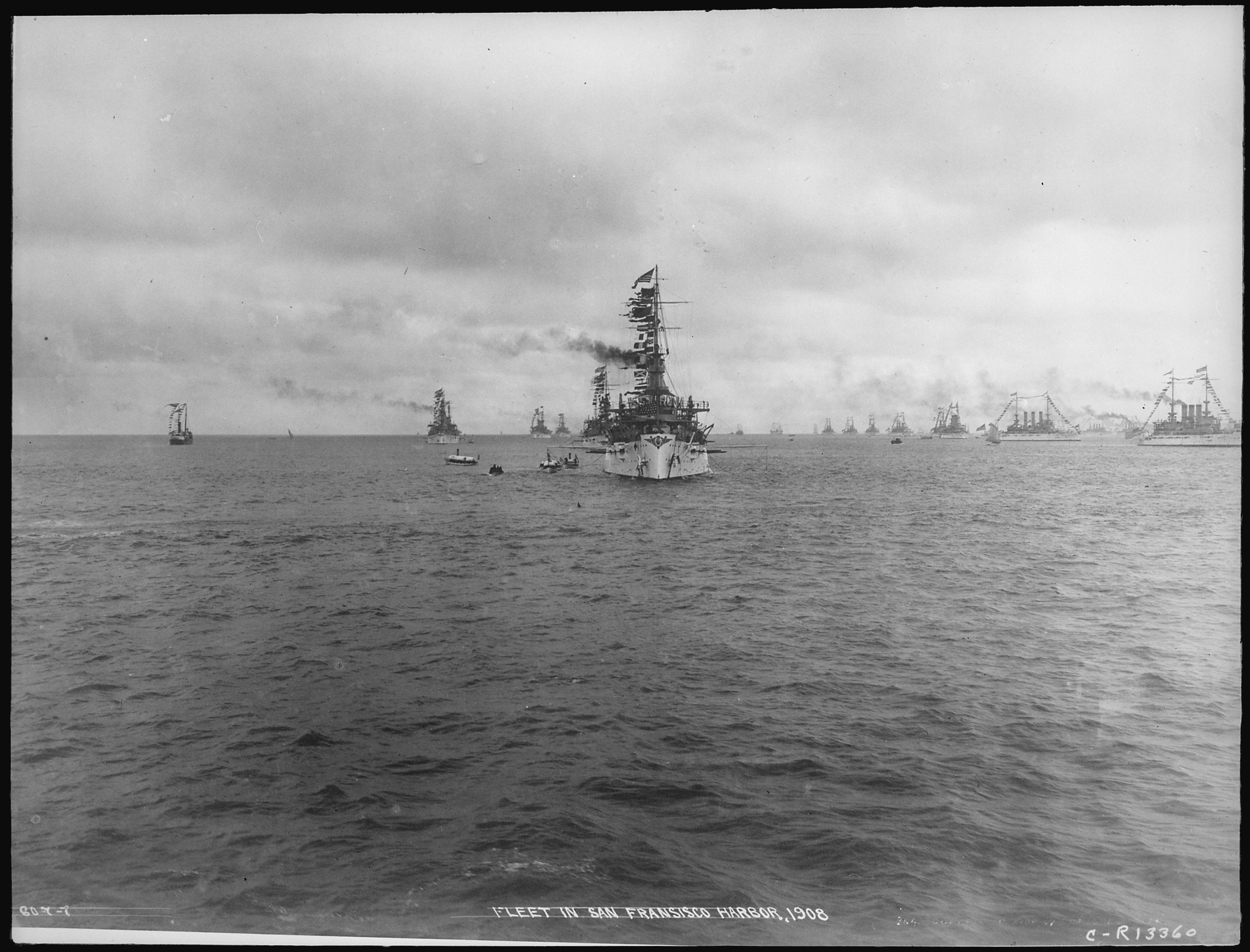
The fleet in San Francisco: Virginia is closest to the camera, with the other ships anchored nearby.

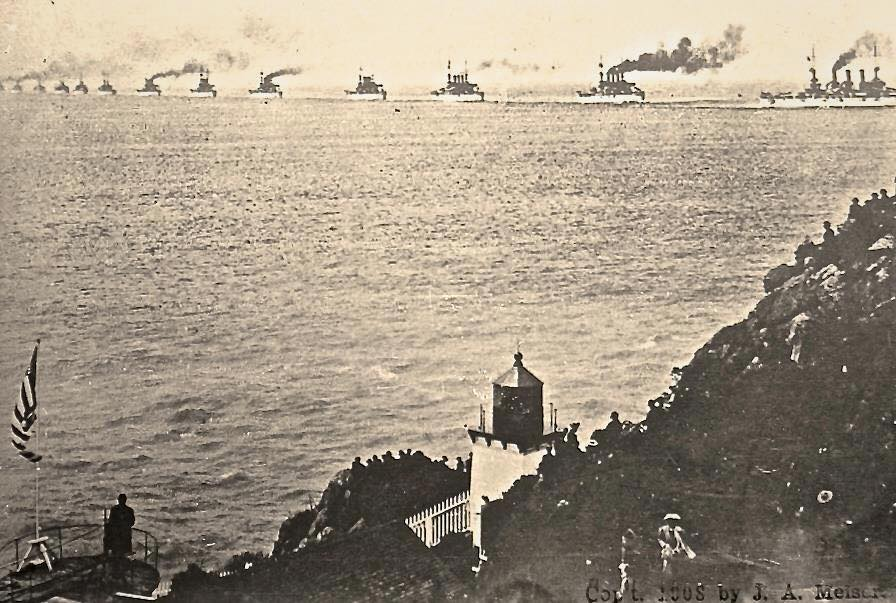
Great White Fleet passing Trinidad Head, California 1908

The second leg of the voyage was from San Francisco to Puget Sound and back. On 23 May 1908 the 16 battleships of the Great White Fleet steamed into Puget Sound where they separated to visit six Washington state ports: Bellingham, Bremerton, Port Angeles, Port Townsend, Seattle and Tacoma. The fleet arrived in Seattle on 23 May and departed 27 May 1908.

=== Ships ===
The Fleet, First Squadron, and First Division were commanded by Rear Admiral Charles S. Sperry. First Division consisted of Connecticut, the Fleet's flagship, Captain Hugo Osterhaus; Kansas, Captain Charles E. Vreeland; Minnesota, Captain John Hubbard; and Vermont, Captain William P. Potter.

Second Division was commanded by Rear Admiral Richard Wainwright. Second Division consisted of Georgia, the Division flagship, Captain Edward F. Qualtrough; Nebraska, Captain Reginald F. Nicholson, replacing her sister Virginia; New Jersey, Captain William H.H. Southerland; and Rhode Island, Captain Joseph B. Murdock.

Second Squadron and Third Division were commanded by Rear Admiral William H. Emory. Third Division consisted of Louisiana, the Squadron's flagship, Captain Kossuth Niles; Virginia, Captain Alexander Sharp; Missouri, Captain Robert M. Doyle; and Ohio, Captain Thomas B. Howard.

Fourth Division was commanded by Rear Admiral Seaton Schroeder. Fourth Division consisted of Wisconsin, the Division flagship, Captain Frank E. Beatty, which replaced her sister Alabama; Illinois, Captain John M. Bowyer; Kearsarge, Captain Hamilton Hutchins; and Kentucky, Captain Walter C. Cowles.

The Fleet Auxiliaries were Culgoa (a storeship), Lieutenant Commander John B. Patton; Yankton (a tender), Lieutenant Commander Charles B. McVay; Glacier (a storeship), Commander William S. Hogg; Relief (a hospital ship), Surgeon Charles F. Stokes; and Panther (a repair ship), Commander Valentine S. Nelson.

== Third leg ==
From San Francisco to Manila, 16,336 nautical miles (30,254 km).

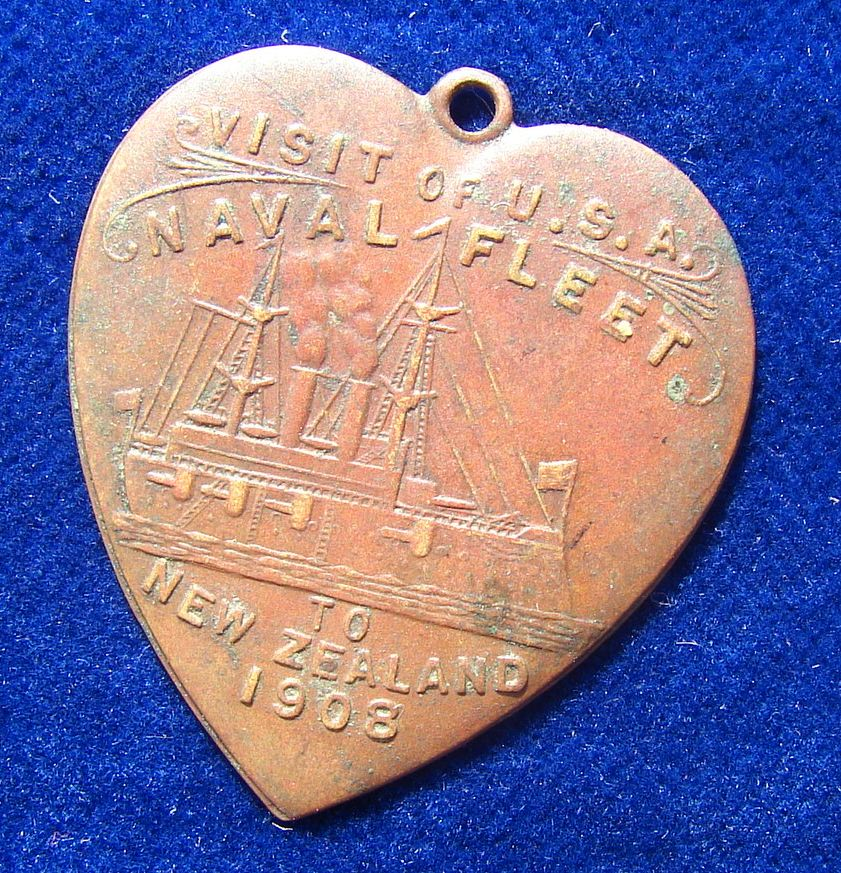
1908 bronze medallion for the Great White Fleet's visit to Auckland, New Zealand

=== Itinerary ===
Port	Arrival	Departure	Distance to next port
San Francisco, California		7 July 1908	2,126 nmi (3,937 km)
Honolulu, Hawaii	16 July 1908	22 July 1908	3,870 nmi (7,170 km)
Auckland, New Zealand	9 August 1908	15 August 1908	1,307 nmi (2,421 km)
Sydney, New South Wales, Australia	20 August 1908	28 August 1908	601 nmi (1,113 km)
Melbourne, Victoria, Australia	29 August 1908	5 September 1908	1,368 nmi (2,534 km)
Albany, Western Australia, Australia	11 September 1908	18 September 1908	3,458 nmi (6,404 km)
Manila, Philippines	2 October 1908	9 October 1908	1,795 nmi (3,324 km)
Yokohama, Japan	18 October 1908	25 October 1908	1,811 nmi (3,354 km)
Amoy, China (Second Squadron)	29 October 1908	5 November 1908	
Manila, Philippines (First Squadron)	31 October 1908		
Manila, Philippines (Second Squadron)	7 November 1908		

=== Ships ===
The Fleet, First Squadron, and First Division were commanded by Rear Admiral Charles S. Sperry. First Division consisted of Connecticut, the Fleet's flagship, Captain Hugo Osterhaus; Kansas, Captain Charles E. Vreeland; Minnesota, Captain John Hubbard; and Vermont, Captain William P. Potter.

Second Division consisted of Georgia, the Division flagship, Captain Edward F. Qualtrough; Nebraska, Captain Reginald F. Nicholson; New Jersey, Captain William H.H. Southerland; and Rhode Island, Captain Joseph B. Murdock.

The Second Squadron and Third Division were commanded by Rear Admiral William H. Emory. Third Division consisted of Louisiana, the Squadron flagship, Captain Kossuth Niles; Virginia, Captain Alexander Sharp; Missouri, Captain Robert M. Doyle; and Ohio, Captain Thomas B. Howard.

Fourth Division was commanded by Rear Admiral Seaton Schroeder. Fourth Division consisted of Wisconsin, the Division flagship, Captain Frank E. Beatty; Illinois, Captain John M. Bowyer; Kearsarge, Captain Hamilton Hutchins; and Kentucky, Captain Walter C. Cowles.

The Fleet Auxiliaries were Culgoa (a storeship), Lieutenant Commander John B. Patton; Yankton (a tender), Lieutenant Commander Charles B. McVay; Glacier (a storeship), Commander William S. Hogg; Relief (a hospital ship), Surgeon Charles F. Stokes; and Panther (a repair ship), Commander Valentine S. Nelson.

== Final leg ==
The final leg ran from Manila to Hampton Roads, 12,455 nautical miles (23,067 km).

=== Itinerary ===
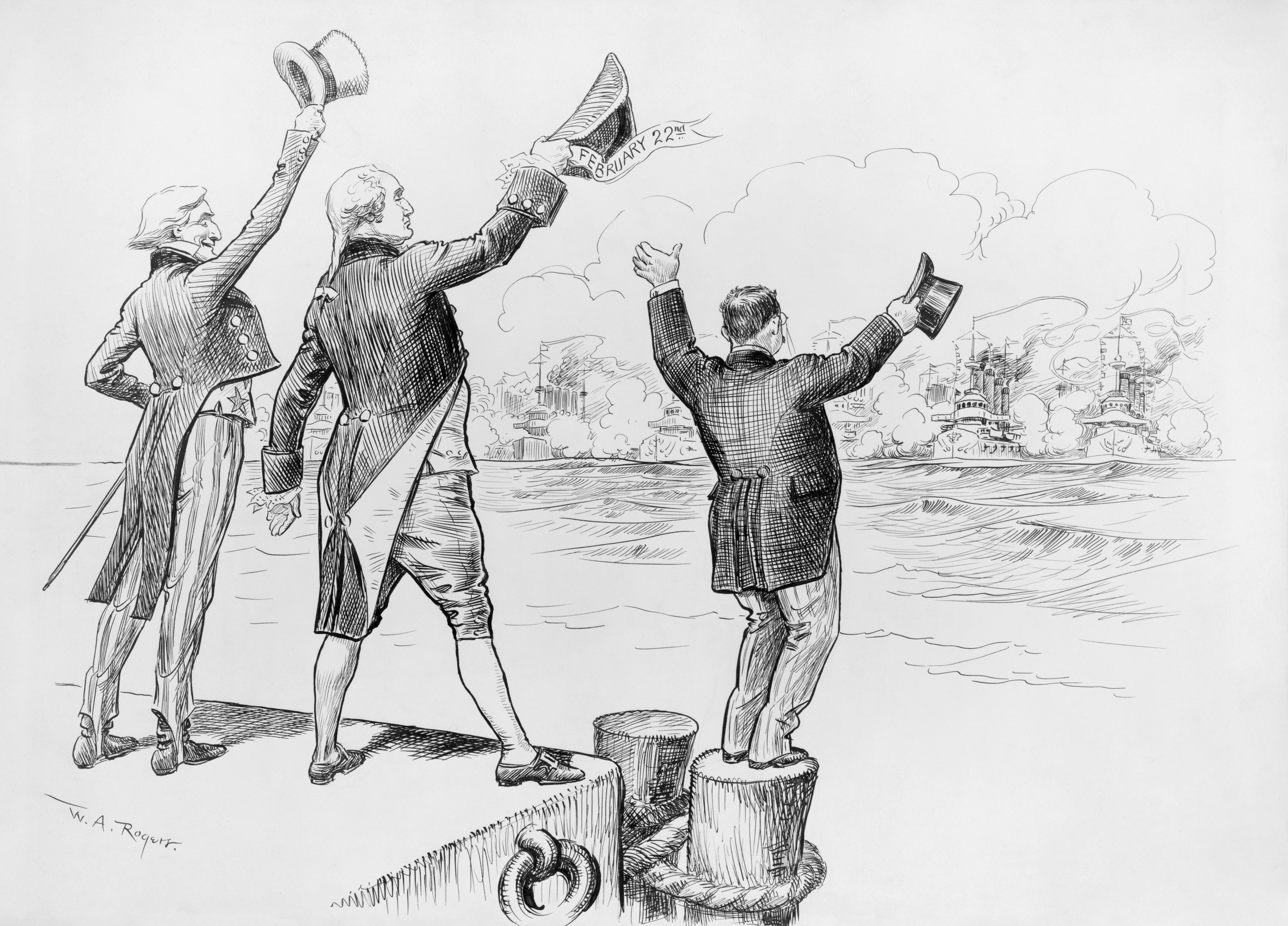
Political cartoon from The New York Herald, 22 February 1909. Uncle Sam, George Washington and Theodore Roosevelt welcome the Great White Fleet home to Hampton Roads, Virginia.

Port	Arrival	Departure	Distance to next port
Manila, Philippine Islands		1 December 1908	2,985 nmi (5,528 km)
Colombo, Ceylon	13 December 1908	20 December 1908	3,448 nmi (6,386 km)
Suez, Egypt	3 January 1909	4–6 January 1909	2,443 nmi (4,524 km)
Gibraltar	31 January – 1 February 1909	6 February 1909	3,579 nmi (6,628 km)
Hampton Roads, Virginia	22 February 1909		

== Experience gained ==
The cruise of the Great White Fleet provided practical experience for US naval personnel in sea duty and ship handling. It also showed the viability of US warships for long-range operations as no major mechanical mishaps occurred. However, while the cruise uncovered design flaws, it did not test the abilities to engage in battle fleet action. These included excessive draft, low armor belts, large turret openings and exposed ammunition hoists. In fact, the success of the deployment might have helped obscure design deficiencies that were not addressed until World War I.

According to Mark Albertson:

Theodore Roosevelt's battleships captured the imagination of the world. The cruise proved an immense public relation success for the Navy. Relations were fostered with nations that hitherto had been little more than names on a map; while relations with the familiar capitals were enhanced. The cruise highlighted such deficiencies in American battleship design as the placement of armor and ammunition hoists. The lack of American logistical support was also laid bare, ramming home the lesson that without an adequate homegrown merchant marine, control of the seas was all but impossible....It demonstrated America's ability to transfer power from the Atlantic Ocean to the Pacific. Valuable lessons learned in the projection of sea power would later pay handsome dividends in two global conflicts. But of greater importance is that Roosevelt's gambit elevated the United States to the ranks of a global powers.

The Times of London editorialized regarding the extremely enthusiastic reception in Australia: "A spectacular display has valuable uses in impressing the masses, who will remember the sight for years, and draw important political deductions therefrom."

== Effects on US capital ship design ==
The South Carolina-class battleship was laid down in 1906 and entered service in 1910 as the first American dreadnought. It was coal fired. While the capital ships of the Great White Fleet were already obsolete in light of the "big gun" revolution ushered in by the construction of HMS Dreadnought, their behavior at sea furnished valuable information that affected future construction. For instance, in terms of seaworthiness, all the capital ships in the fleet proved wet in all but the calmest seas, which led to the flared bows of subsequent U.S. battleships, increased freeboard forward and such spray-reducing measures as the elimination of billboards for anchors and gun sponsons. Increased freeboard was needed; this and related considerations demanded increases in beam and overall size. Between the Florida-class battleships, the last American capital ships completed before data from the cruise became available, and the Wyoming class, the first designed after this data was received, displacement (and, as a result, cost) per ship increased by one third.

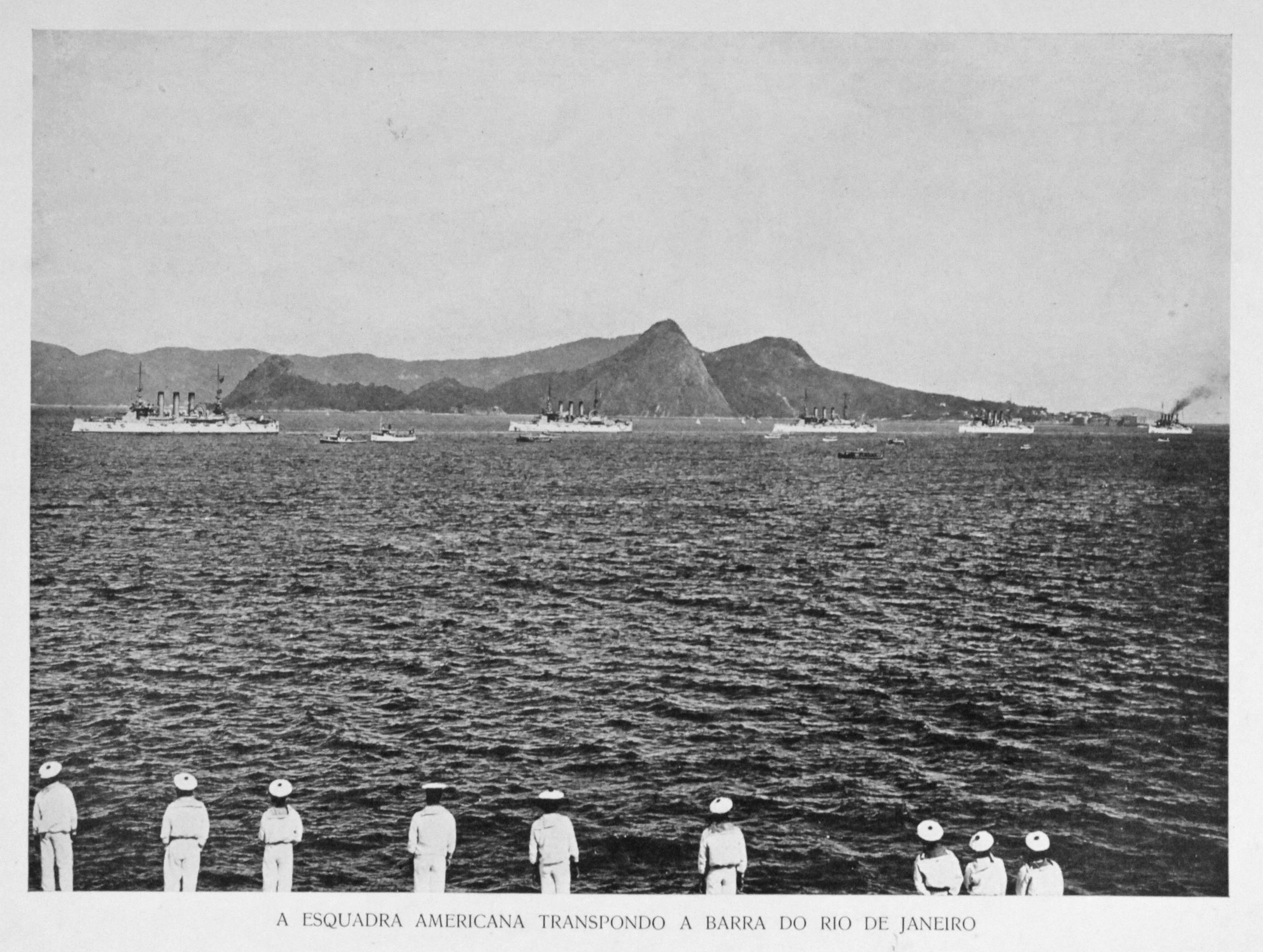
12 January 1908 – Arrival at Rio de Janeiro – Fleet enters Guanabara Bay

Deficiencies in seaworthiness in turn reduced the battle-worthiness of the fleet. Turret heights for main armament proved too low and needed to be raised. Secondary armament was useless at speed and especially in tradewind conditions (with the wind moving over the sea at 10 knots (19 km/h) or greater) and needed to be moved much higher in the hull. Improved placement began with the Wyoming-class battleships and was further refined in the Nevada class. Casemates for the bow 3-inch guns in the newer pre-dreadnoughts were untenable due to wetness and were removed. Another discovery was that, even when fully loaded, the bottom of the battleships' side armor was visible—and the ships thus vulnerable to shells that might hit beneath it to reach their machinery and magazines—in smooth to moderate seas. The profile of crests and troughs in some ships contributed to this problem. Admiral Evans concluded that the standard 8-foot (2.4 m) width of belt armor was inadequate.

One other necessity the cruise outlined was the need for tactical homogeneity. Before the cruise, critics such as then-Captain William Sims (to whom President Roosevelt listened) had argued that American warship design had remained too conservative and precluded the level of efficiency needed for the fleet to function as an effective unit. The cruise proved the charge true. This would eventually lead to the building of standard-type battleships in the U.S. Navy. When President Roosevelt convened the 1908 Newport Conference of the Naval War College, he placed responsibility for U.S. battleship design on the General Board of the United States Navy. This gave line officers and planners direct input and control over warship design, a pattern which has persisted to the present day.

== Effects on fleet operations ==
Experience gained by the cruise led to improvements in formation steaming, coal economy and morale. Gunnery exercises doubled the fleet's accuracy. However, the mission also underlined the fleet's dependence on foreign colliers and the need for coaling stations and auxiliary ships for resupply.

== See also ==
- List of circumnavigations
- Big Stick ideology and Peace through strength

=== Similar voyages ===
- Squadron of Evolution — US 19th century squadron touring Europe, nicknamed "White Squadron"
- Cruise of the Special Service Squadron — UK naval circumnavigation tour after the Great War
- Operation Sea Orbit — World cruise by U.S. nuclear-powered vessels without replenishment, inspired by the Great White Fleet

== Bibliography ==
- Albertson, Mark (2007). They'll Have to Follow You Home!: The Triumph of the Great White Fleet. Mustang, Oklahoma: Tate Publishing & Enterprises LLC. ISBN 978-1-60462-145-7.
- Busch, Noel F. (1969). The Emperor's Sword; Japan vs. Russia in the Battle of Tsushima. New York: Funk & Wagnalls. OCLC 12442.
- Carter, Samuel III (1971). The Incredible Great White Fleet. New York City: Crowell-Collier Press. LCCN 77-129747., for secondary schools
- Crawford, M. J. (2008). The World Cruise of the Great White Fleet: Honoring 100 Years of Global Partnerships and Security. Washington, DC: Naval Historical Center. ISBN 978-0945274599.
- Friedman, Norman (1985). U.S. Battleships: An Illustrated Design History. Annapolis: Naval Institute Press. ISBN 0-87021-715-1. OCLC 12214729.
- Hart, R. A. (1965). The Great White Fleet: Its Voyage Around the World, 1907–1909. Boston: Little Brown. OCLC 965439.
- Hodge, Carl Cavanagh. "A Whiff of Cordite: Theodore Roosevelt and the Transoceanic Naval Arms Race, 1897–1909." Diplomacy & Statecraft 19.4 (2008): 712–31.
- Holmes, James R. "'A Striking Thing' Leadership, Strategic Communications, and Roosevelt’s Great White Fleet." Naval War College Review 61.1 (2008): 50–67. Online
- Leeman, William, and John B Hattendorf, eds. Forging the Trident: Theodore Roosevelt and the United States Navy (2020) excerpt ch 9.
- Love, Robert W., Jr. History of the US Navy: Volume One 1775–1941 (Stackpole, 1992) 1:434–56.
- McMahon, Christopher. "The Great White Fleet Sails Today?" Naval War College Review 71.4 (2018): 67–90. online
- Megaw, Ruth. "Australia and the Great White Fleet 1908" Journal of the Royal Australian Historical Society (April 1970) 56#2 pp. 121–33; focus on the reasons for the thunderous reception in terms of fear of Japan after its navy sank the Russian navy.
- Neu, Charles E. An Uncertain Friendship: Theodore Roosevelt and Japan, 1906–1909 (1967) pp. 254–309, on war scare with Japan
- Nolte, Carl (6 May 2008). "Great White Fleet Visited S.F. 100 Years Ago". San Francisco Chronicle. p. B3.
- Oyos, Matthew M. "Theodore Roosevelt and the implements of war." Journal of Military History 60.4 (1996): 631+ online
- Pellett, C. Roger. "Boats of the Great White Fleet: The Standard United States Navy Boats of 1900" Nautical Research Journal (Winter 2012) 57#4 pp. 209–16.
- Reckner, J. R. (1988). Teddy Roosevelt's Great White Fleet: The World Cruise of the American Battlefleet, 1907–1909. Annapolis: Naval Institute Press. ISBN 978-0870216978.
- Semenov, Vladimir (1912). The Battle of Tsushima. New York: E.P. Dutton & Co. OCLC 51432337.
- Werry, Margaret. "'The Greatest Show on Earth': Political Spectacle, Spectacular Politics, and the American Pacific." Theatre Journal 57.3 (2005): 355–82. about the Great White Fleet; excerpt
- Wimmel, K. (1998). Theodore Roosevelt and the Great White Fleet: American Sea Power Comes of Age. Washington, DC: Brassey's. ISBN 978-1574881530.

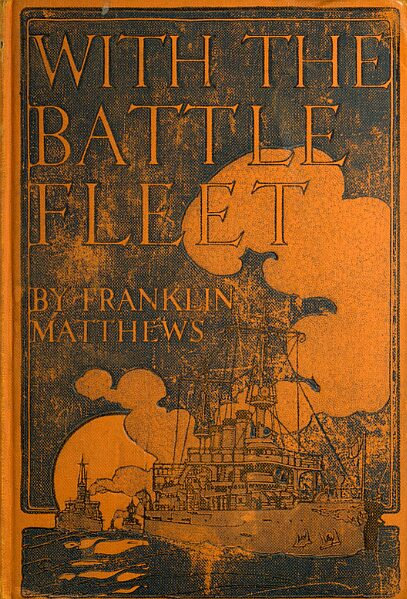
book jacket of Matthews, With the Battle Fleet (1908)

=== Primary sources ===
- Codd, Margaret J. With Evans to the Pacific: A Story of the Battle Fleet (1909), a novel.
- Matthews, Franklin. With the Battle Fleet: Cruise of the sixteen battleships of the United States Atlantic Fleet from Hampton Roads to the Golden Gate, December 1907–May 1908 (1908) online
- Matthews, Franklin. Back to Hampton Roads: Cruise of the US Atlantic Fleet from San Francisco to Hampton Roads, July 7, 1908–February 22, 1909 (1909) online
- Miller, Roman John. Around the World with the Battleships (AC McClurg & Company, 1909). online, sailor accounts
- Miller, Roman John. Pictorial log of the battle fleet cruise around the world (1909).
