= John M. Bowyer =

United States admiral (1853–1912)

John Marshall Bowyer
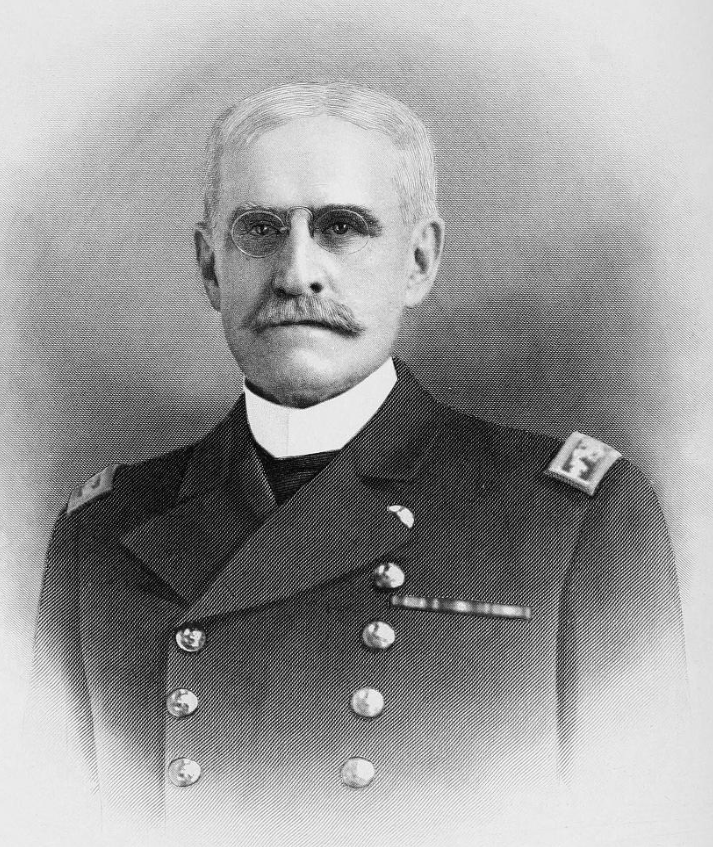
- Born: June 19, 1853; Tipton, Indiana, U.S.
- Died: March 15, 1912 (aged 58); Tampa, Florida, U.S.
- Burial place: Erie Cemetery, Erie, Pennsylvania
- Relatives: Douglas Legate Howard (son-in-law)
- Military career
- Allegiance: United States
- Branch: United States Navy
- Service years: 1870–1911
- Rank: Rear admiral
- Commands: Superintendent, Naval Academy; USS Columbia; USS Illinois; USS Connecticut

Signature
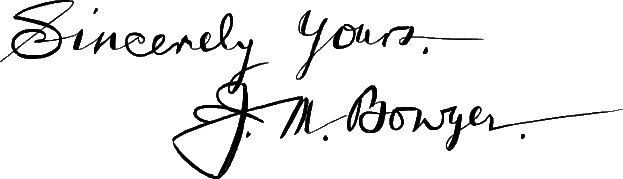

Rear Admiral John Marshall Bowyer (June 19, 1853 – March 15, 1912) was an officer in the United States Navy.

== Biography ==
Bowyer was born in Cass County, Indiana; and in 1870, he was appointed to the United States Naval Academy from Iowa. He graduated from the Naval Academy in 1874.

Ensign Bowyer served aboard the ship Michigan attached to the Northwestern Lake station. From 1881 through 1884, he was on the sloop Wachusett in the Pacific.

In 1887, he was assigned to special instruction in the torpedo service. Then he was detailed to the Asiatic Station where he served aboard the screw sloop Omaha. Bowyer returned to the Naval Academy from 1891 through 1894.

For the next three years, Bowyer was attached to the North Atlantic Station, serving on the cruisers Detroit and Raleigh, and the ill-fated battleship Maine.

At the outbreak of the Spanish–American War, Bowyer was assigned as executive officer aboard the gunboat Princeton: and from 1898 through 1901, he served on the Yorktown. He was promoted to lieutenant commander in 1899.

In 1901, Lieutenant Commander Bowyer was assigned to ordinance duty at the Washington Navy Yard.

Subsequently, Lieutenant Commander Boyer commanded the Columbia.

Bowyer reached the rank of captain in 1907. He commanded the battleship Illinois on the "Great White Fleet" cruise around the world. Then he commanded the battleship Connecticut, the flagship of the Atlantic Fleet.

Captain Bowyer was the superintendent of the Naval Academy at Annapolis from June 10, 1909, through May 15, 1911.

Bowyer reached flag rank in September 1911; and he retired from the Navy with the rank of rear admiral.

He died in Tampa, Florida, on March 15, 1912.
