= Charles Stillman Sperry =

United States admiral

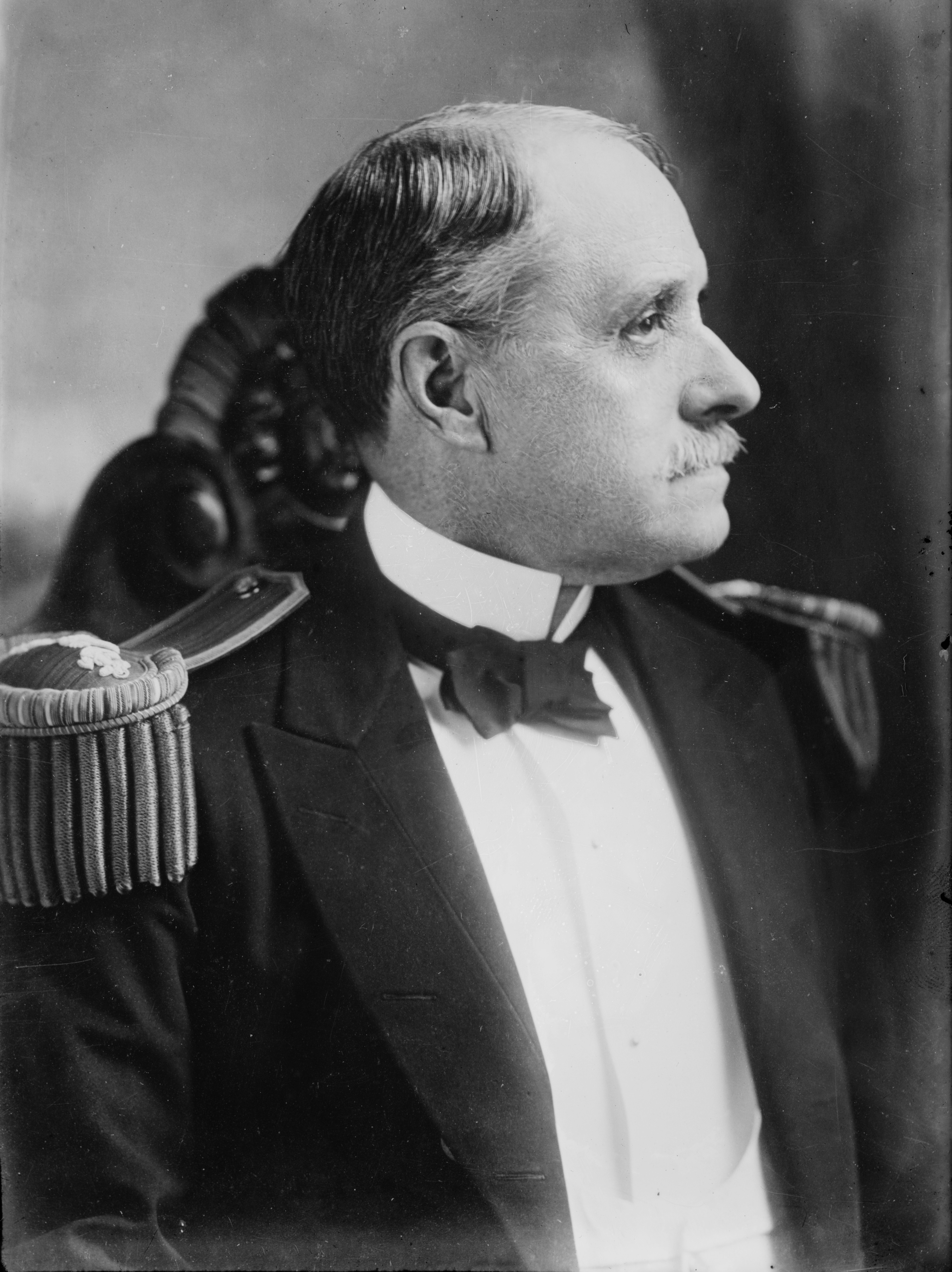
- Charles Stillman Sperry in February 1909
- Born: September 3, 1847; Brooklyn, New York, US
- Died: February 1, 1911 (aged 63); Washington, D.C., US
- Burial place: Arlington National Cemetery; Section 2, Site 1102; 38.8801°N 77.0720°W
- Military career
- Allegiance: United States
- Branch: United States Navy
- Service years: 1866–1909
- Rank: Rear Admiral

Rear Admiral Charles Stillman Sperry (September 3, 1847 – February 1, 1911) was an officer in the United States Navy.

Born in Brooklyn, New York, Sperry graduated from the Naval Academy in 1866. In November 1898, he became commanding officer of USS Yorktown (PG-1) and later served as senior officer of the Southern Squadron on the Asiatic Station and as President of the Naval War College.

As a rear admiral, he served in the United States delegation to the Geneva Convention and the Second Hague Conference, and as Commander in Chief, Battle Fleet, he led the Great White Fleet during the major portion of its historic cruise around the world in 1908 and 1909.

Sperry retired September 3, 1909, but subsequently was recalled to active duty for special service. He died February 1, 1911, in Washington, D.C. The destroyer USS Charles S. Sperry (DD-697) was named for him.

Military offices
Previous: French Ensor Chadwick	President of the Naval War College; 1903-1906	Next: John Porter Merrell
Previous: Charles M. Thomas	Commander-in-Chief of the U.S. Atlantic Fleet; 1908–1909	Next: Seaton Schroeder
