= USS Charles S. Sperry =

Allen M. Sumner-class destroyer

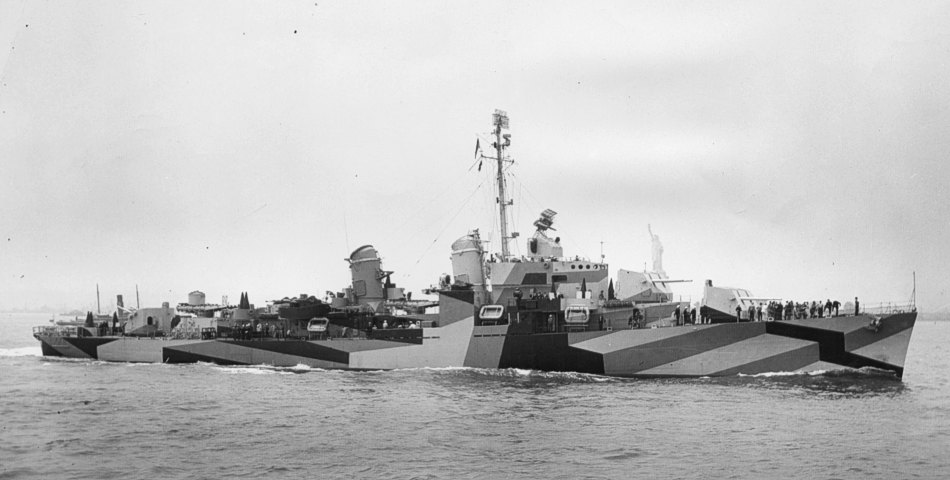
- USS Charles S. Sperry in New York Harbor, 16 May 1944

History

United States
- Name: USS Charles S. Sperry
- Namesake: Charles Stillman Sperry
- Builder: Federal Shipbuilding and Drydock Company
- Laid down: 19 October 1943
- Launched: 13 March 1944
- Sponsored by: Miss M. Sperry
- Commissioned: 17 May 1944
- Decommissioned: 15 December 1973
- Stricken: 15 December 1973
- Fate: Sold to Chile, 8 January 1974

Chile
- Name: Ministro Zenteno
- Acquired: 8 January 1974
- Stricken: 1990
- Fate: Scrapped 1990

General characteristics
- Class & type: Allen M. Sumner-class destroyer
- Displacement: 2,200 tons (standard), 3,320 (full load)
- Length: 376 ft 6 in (114.76 m)
- Beam: 40 ft (12 m)
- Draft: 15 ft 8 in (4.78 m)
- Propulsion: 60,000 shp (45 MW); 2 propellers
- Speed: 34 knots (63 km/h; 39 mph)
- Range: 6,500 nautical miles (12,000 km; 7,500 mi) at 15 knots (28 km/h; 17 mph)
- Complement: 336 as designed, 276 after refit
- Armament: 6 × 5 in (130 mm)/38 guns, 12 × 40 mm AA guns, 11 × 20 mm AA guns, 10 × 21 inch (533 mm) torpedo tubes, 6 × depth charge projectors, 2 × depth charge tracks
- Aircraft carried: 1 × helicopter (after refit)

USS Charles S. Sperry (DD-697) was an Allen M. Sumner-class destroyer in service with the United States Navy from 1944 to 1973. In 1974, she was sold to Chile, where she served as Ministro Zenteno (D-16). She was finally scrapped in 1990.

== History ==
USS Charles S. Sperry was named for Charles Stillman Sperry, the commanding officer of Yorktown. Sperry would later attain the rank of rear admiral. She was launched 13 March 1944 by Federal Shipbuilding and Drydock Company, Kearny, New Jersey; sponsored by Miss M. Sperry; commissioned 17 May 1944.

=== United States Navy ===
==== World War II ====
After training in the Hawaiian Islands, Charles S. Sperry arrived at Ulithi 28 December 1944 to join the fast carrier force, TP 38. For the remainder of the war, she sailed in the screen of the third group of this mighty force, variously designated TF 38 and TF 58. She sortied with her group for the first time on 30 December, bound for the areas from which the carriers launched strikes against Japanese bases on Formosa and Luzon in preparation for the assault on Lingayen Gulf beaches. Continuing to neutralize Japanese airfields the force moved on to strike at targets in Indochina, on the South China coast, and on Okinawa before returning to Ulithi 26 January 1945.

Sperry sailed with TF 58 once more on 10 February 1945, as the force began its familiar work in preparation for the invasion of Iwo Jima. An audacious raid against Tokyo itself was first on the schedule, the first carrier strikes on the heart of Japan since the Doolittle Raid. On 16 and 17 February, planes from the carriers guarded by Sperry roared over Tokyo, in attacks which inflicted substantial material damage, and great moral damage, to the Japanese war effort. Sperry forces offered direct support during the assault landings at Iwo Jima. Twice, on 19 February and on 20–21 February, the carrier force came under air attack from the enemy, but antiaircraft fire from Sperry and the other screening ships, combined with evasive maneuvering and a protective smoke screen, prevented damage to the great concentration of ships. A final round of air strikes was hurled at Tokyo and Okinawa before TF 58 returned to Ulithi 5 March.

Once more designated TF 38, the force cleared Ulithi 14 March 1945 for the Okinawa operation, which would keep Sperry and many other ships at sea almost continuously until 1 June. First came air strikes against Kyushu, for which the Japanese retaliated with heavy air attacks against the carrier force on 19 and 20 March. While Franklin was badly damaged in these attacks, Sperry and other escorts furnished effective antiaircraft fire which pre vented further harm to the force, and she shared in splashing several Japanese planes.

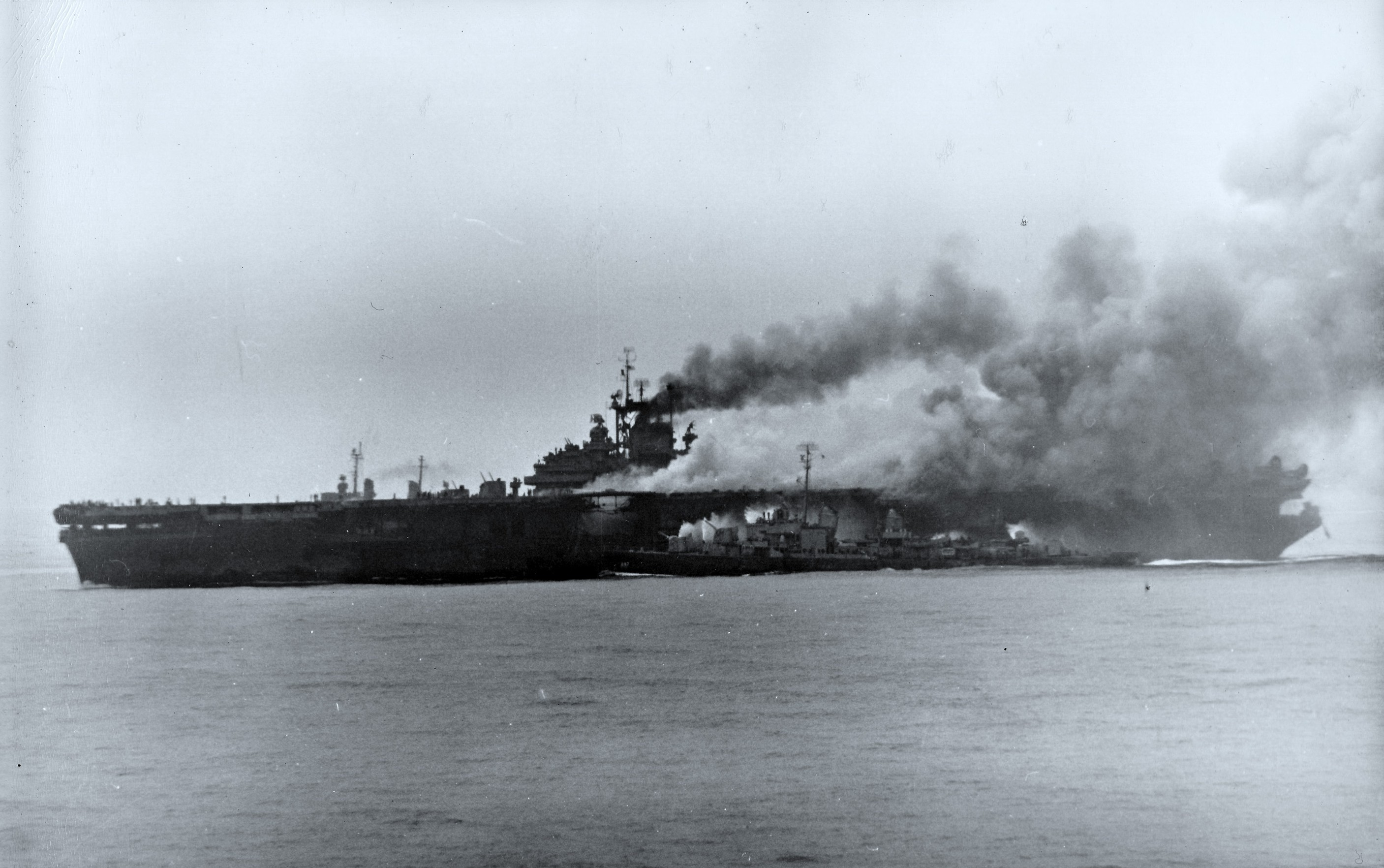
USS Charles S. Sperry alongside USS Bunker Hill, 11 May 1945.

Sperry turned south with her force for strikes against Okinawa. The destroyer joined in a bombardment of the Japanese airstrip on tiny but critically located Minami Daito Shima 27 March. Close air support was provided by TF 38 as the invasion began on 1 April 1945, and Sperry served as plane guard and radar picket for her force. On 7 April, planes from the carriers she screened joined in sending Yamato, her accompanying cruiser, and four of eight guardian destroyers to the bottom. Sperry herself fired often, aiding in splashing planes of the kamikaze strikes hurled at her force on 11, 14, 16, and 29 April, and 11 May. When Hancock and Bunker Hill fell victim to kamikazes, Sperry stood by them, aiding in damage control, and rescuing men from the water.

The destroyer remained in San Pedro Bay, Philippines, from 1 June to 1 July, and then sailed to support the carriers as they launched the final air strikes at the Japanese home islands. Cover for the first occupation landings and the evacuation of Allied prisoners of war from Japanese prison camps was flown by the carriers, and on 31 August, the great force arrived off Tokyo Bay for the surrender ceremonies held on 2 September.

=== Post-World War II ===
Sperry remained in the Far East, taking part in exercises, on patrol, and carrying mail, until 30 December 1945, when she departed Sasebo for the east coast, arriving at Baltimore 19 February 1946. For the next year, she remained at Boston with a reduced crew, and in March 1947, reported at New Orleans for duty as a training ship for members of the Naval Reserve until July 1950. After overhaul at Norfolk, she sailed for the Far East, arriving off embattled Korea 14 October 1950.

==== Korean War ====
The destroyer operated almost continuously off Korea until June 1951. For her first 2 weeks in action, she fired on shore installations at Songjin, screened shipping, and patrolled areas swept of mines to guard against their remaining. During November and December 1950 she continued her fire support and bombardments, covered the redeployments from Kojo, Wonsan, and Hung-nam, and screened salvage operations. On 23 December, while firing at Songjin, she was hit by three shells returned by an enemy shore battery, but suffered no casualties, and only minor damage, which was repaired at Sasebo early in January 1951. She returned to the Korean firing line to cover salvage operations north of the 38th parallel and conduct bombardments along the coast.

As operations leading to the classic blockade of Wonsan began, Charles S. Sperry entered the dangerous harbor 17 January 1951 to provide interdiction fire, and to cover the landings which secured the harbor islands. She cleared the Wonsan area 5 March for Songjin, where she joined in setting the siege, and until 6 June was almost constantly patrolling and firing on shore installations at Songjin. She then sailed for home, arriving at Norfolk 2 July.

=== Service, 1951-1974 ===
Taking up the operating schedule of the Destroyer Force, Atlantic, Charles S. Sperry sailed from Norfolk through 1960. In 1953, 1955, 1956, 1958, and 1959 she cruised in the Mediterranean with the 6th Fleet. During her 1956 deployment, which coincided with the Suez Crisis, she escorted the transports which evacuated American nationals from Egypt. Midshipmen cruises and North Atlantic Treaty Organization exercises took her to northern European ports on several occasions, some of them in coordination with her Mediterranean deployments.

Late in 1959, Sperry began an extensive overhaul for rehabilitation and modernization, including the addition of a sophisticated remotely operated torpedo equipped anti-submarine helicopter known as Drone Anti Submarine Helicopter (DASH). After completion of this major refitting she operated on the east coast and was located in Newport RI in the late 1960s.

In the summer of 1968 she cruised the Caribbean and was in San Juan, Puerto Rico in late June as the U S Navy's representative for the celebration of feast of St. John (San Juan), a national holiday.

[1960-1974]

=== Chilean Navy ===
On 8 January 1974, Charles S. Sperry was transferred to Chile by sale. She was renamed Ministro Zenteno (D-16). After many years of active service in the Chilean Navy, the old destroyer was finally scrapped in 1990.

== Awards ==
Charles S. Sperry received four battle stars for her service in World War II, and four battle stars for the Korean War.
