= Douglas Legate Howard =

American football player, coach, and soldier (1885–1936)

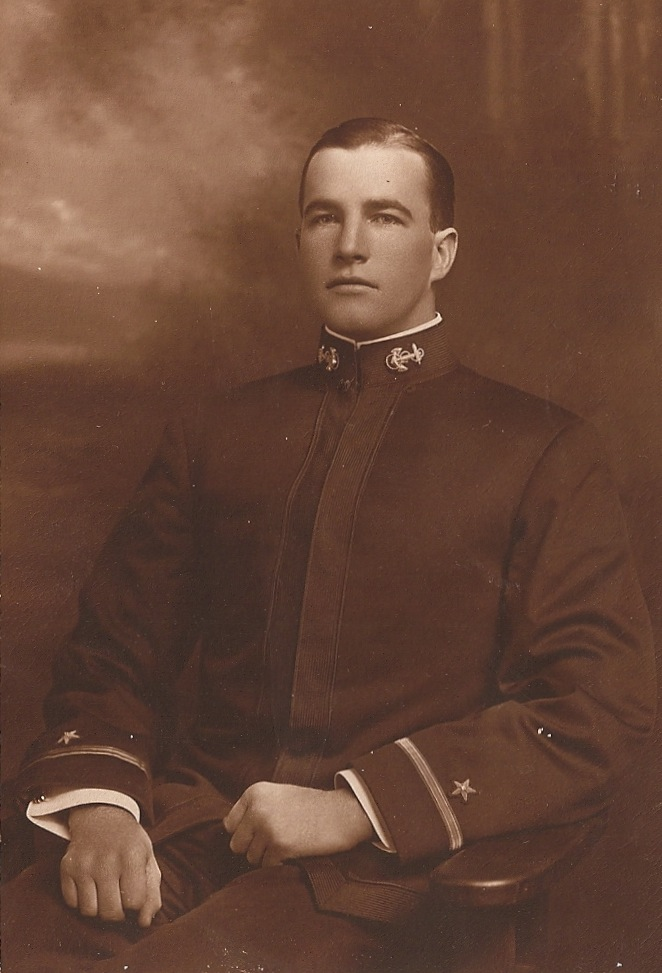
- Midshipman Douglas L. Howard
- Born: February 11, 1885; Annapolis, Maryland, U.S.
- Died: December 14, 1936 (aged 51); Annapolis, Maryland, U.S.
- Burial place: United States Naval Academy
- Spouse: Ruth Bowyer Howard
- Military career
- Allegiance: United States
- Branch: United States Navy
- Service years: 1906–1933
- Rank: Captain
- Nickname: "Doug"
- Commands: USS Drayton (DD-23); USS Rowan (DD-64); USS Bell (DD-95)
- Conflicts: World War I
- Awards: Navy Cross
- Other work: Head coach, United States Naval Academy Midshipmen

Douglas Legate Howard (February 11, 1885 – December 14, 1936) was an American college football player and coach and United States Navy officer. He served as the commander of three destroyers during World War I and later as the division commander of destroyers with command of the fleet flagship, the USS Seattle.

He also served as a player, captain, and head coach of the Navy Midshipmen football team. In four years as Navy's head football coach, Howard's teams compiled 25–7–4 record. He also served as the Naval Academy's athletic director from 1919 to 1921.

After retiring from the Navy, Howard served from 1934 to 1936 as the dean of St. John's College and, for a short time prior to his death, as president of the Annapolis Banking and Trust Company.

== Early life ==
Howard was born in 1885 in Annapolis, Maryland. His father, Thomas B. Howard, was an officer in the United States Navy, and his grandfather, Abram Claude, was the mayor of Annapolis and a member of the faculty at the United States Naval Academy. Howard attended the St. John's preparatory school for two years and then the Naval Academy itself. He played football at the academy, serving as captain of the 1905 Navy Midshipmen football team the compiled a 10–1–1 record. He was also the academy's heavyweight boxing champion and received the Thompson Trophy Cup as the midshipmen who had done the most to promote athletics.

== Naval and coaching career ==
After graduating from the Naval Academy, he served in the Navy.

In February 1911, Howard was selected as the 14th head coach of the Navy Midshipmen football program. In his first year as head coach, Howard led the 1911 Navy Midshipmen football team to an undefeated 6–0–3 record. He remained as head coach for four seasons, from 1911 until 1914. His coaching record at Navy was 25–7–4.

Howard returned to active duty in 1915 following the outbreak of World War I. He served as commanding officer of the USS Drayton (DD-23), a destroyer that was part of the second group of American warships to enter the war zone. He also held commands during the war of two other destroyers, the USS Rowan (DD-64) and USS Bell (DD-95). He was awarded the Navy Cross for distinguished service in "vigorously and unremittingly" escorting Allied convoys through waters "infested" with German U-boats.

In 1919, he returned to Annapolis, serving as the Naval Academy's athletic director and Secretary-Treasurer of the Naval Athletic Association from 1919 to 1922. As athletic director, he initiated a program requiring every midshipman to be trained in multiple sports. He hired a staff of professional trainers and coaches, and was credited with placing the Naval Academy at "a high place in college sports."

After leaving the academy, Howard was assigned as navigation officer on the battleship USS Texas. In July 1923, he was transferred to the USS Seattle as executive officer (1925-1928). He then served as commander of Destroyer Division 27 of the Scouting Fleet, and after that commander of Destroyer Division 33. He was next assigned to the Office of the Naval Intelligence. He attended the Navy War College from 1930 to 1931 and the Army War College in 1932. He retired from the Navy in 1933.

== Family, later years, and honors ==
Howard was married in November 1910 to Ruth Bowyer, daughter of Superintendent of the United States Naval Academy, Rear Admiral John M. Bowyer. They had two sons, J.M.B. Howard and Joseph B. Howard, and a daughter, Anne (Howard) Thomas.

After retiring from the Navy, Howard was hired as the assistant to the president of St. John's College in Annapolis. He became the dean at St. John's in July 1934. He resigned as dean of St John's in September 1936 to become president of the Annapolis Banking and Trust Company.

Howard died at Annapolis on December 14, 1936, shortly after assuming the presidency of the Annapolis Banking and Trust Company. The cause of death was reported as apoplexy. His funeral was held in the Naval Academy Chapel, and he was buried at the United States Naval Academy Cemetery in Annapolis.

In January 1943, The United States Navy launched a destroyer escort vessel, the USS Douglas L. Howard, named in his honor. The ship was sponsored by Howard's daughter, Mrs. Donald I. Thomas.

== Head coaching record ==
Year	Team	Overall	Conference	Standing	Bowl/playoffs
Navy Midshipmen (Independent) (1911–1914)
1911	Navy	6–0–3			
1912	Navy	6–3			
1913	Navy	7–1–1			
1914	Navy	6–3			
Navy:		25–7–4			
Total:		25–7–4			
