= USS Douglas L. Howard =

1943 Edsall-class destroyer escort

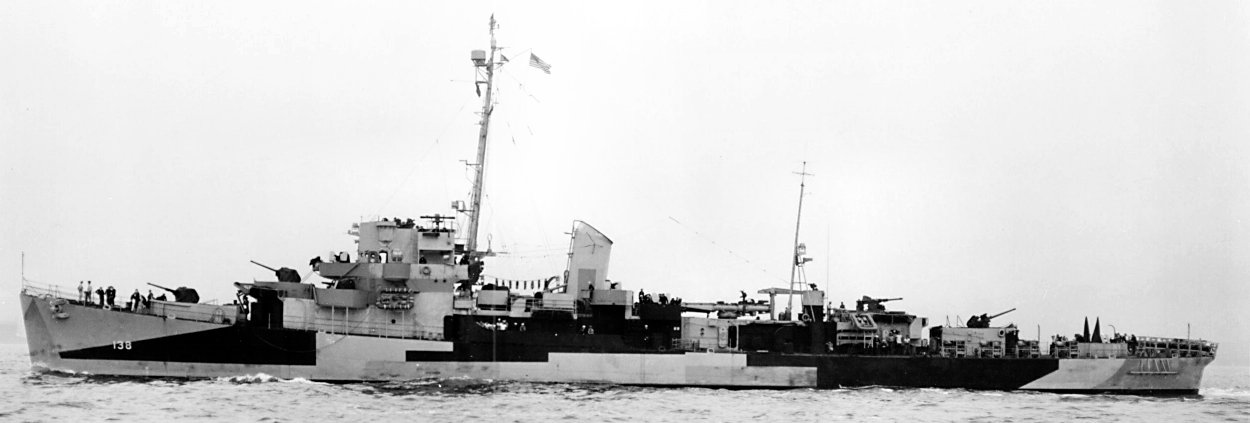

History

United States
- Namesake: Douglas Legate Howard
- Builder: Consolidated Steel Corporation, Orange, Texas
- Laid down: 8 December 1942
- Launched: 24 January 1943
- Commissioned: 29 July 1943
- Decommissioned: 17 June 1946
- Stricken: 1 October 1972
- Fate: Sold 14 May 1974, scrapped

General characteristics
- Class & type: Edsall-class destroyer escort
- Displacement: 1,253 tons standard; 1,590 tons full load
- Length: 306 feet (93.27 m)
- Beam: 36.58 feet (11.15 m)
- Draft: 10.42 full load feet (3.18 m)
- Propulsion: 4 FM diesel engines, 4 diesel-generators, 6,000 shp (4.5 MW), 2 screws
- Speed: 21 knots (39 km/h)
- Range: 9,100 nmi. at 12 knots; (17,000 km at 22 km/h)
- Complement: 8 officers, 201 enlisted
- Armament: 3 × single 3 in (76 mm)/50 guns; 1 × twin 40 mm AA guns; 8 × single 20 mm AA guns; 1 × triple 21 in (533 mm) torpedo tubes; 8 × depth charge projectors; 1 × depth charge projector (hedgehog); 2 × depth charge tracks

USS Douglas L. Howard (DE-138) was an Edsall-class destroyer escort in service with the United States Navy from 1943 to 1946. She was scrapped in 1974.

== History ==
USS Douglas L. Howard was named in honor of Douglas Legate Howard. She was launched 24 January 1943 by Consolidated Steel Corp., Ltd., Orange, Texas; sponsored by Mrs. D. I. Thomas, daughter of Douglas Legate Howard; and commissioned 29 July 1943.

=== Battle of the Atlantic ===
Between 4 October 1943 and 19 March 1944 Douglas L. Howard escorted three convoys to Casablanca, French Morocco. She joined the hunter-killer group operating with USS Core for one cruise between 3 April and 30 May, then made a similar patrol with the group formed around USS Wake Island, from 15 June to 29 August. After repairs at Boston, Massachusetts, she joined Mission Bay for antisubmarine patrol in the South Atlantic from 8 September to 26 November.

Douglas L. Howard continued to screen Mission Bay during training in the Caribbean and the qualification of aviators in carrier operations off Mayport, Florida, then returned to ASW operations in the North Atlantic.

=== Pacific War ===
Douglas L. Howard left Boston 30 June 1945 for San Diego, California, and reached Pearl Harbor 8 August. On 3 September she reported to Eniwetok for patrol and local escort duty, and from 25 September to 16 November she assisted in the occupation of Lele Island in the Carolines and the disposition of its surrendered military equipment. She served on occupation duty in the Marshalls until 6 January 1946 when she left Kwajalein for the United States. She called at San Diego, California, then continued to New York, arriving 15 February.

=== Decommissioning and fate ===
On 13 March she arrived at Green Cove Springs, Florida, where she was placed out of commission in reserve 17 June 1946. She was struck from the Navy List on 1 October 1972 and was sold 14 May 1974 and scrapped.
