= Thomas Bay =

- A kayak route passing through Thomas Bay, Alaska

- Location within Alaska
- Coordinates: 57°01′53″N 132°51′13″W
- Type: Bay

Thomas Bay is a bay located in Southeast Alaska, located to the northeast of Petersburg. Baird Glacier drains into the bay, which is also known as the "Bay of Death" due to a massive landslide in 1750, which claimed the lives of hundreds of locals at the time. In the early 1900s, the region also earned the nickname of "Devil's Country", after several prospectors claimed to have encountered or witnessed "devil-creatures"—alleged to be a form of bipedal, ape-like humanoid, such as sasquatch (i.e. "Bigfoot").

Thomas Bay is named after U.S. Navy officer Charles M. Thomas.

== Natural history ==
Thomas Bay is known for being rich in gold and quartz. The wildlife of the area includes moose, brown bears, black bears, squirrels, wolves, rabbits, and other common Alaskan creatures. The land in the area has been used for logging.

== Bay of Death ==
In 1750, a Tlingit village in Thomas Bay was completely buried by a large landslide. Over 500 Alaska Native people died in the disaster. After that day, the region was dubbed the "Bay of Death" (or Geey Nana in the Tlingit language).

== Devil's Country ==
In 1900, the first documented account of the alleged "devil creatures" of Thomas Bay was written by Harry D. Colp, who had been staying in Wrangell with three of his fellow prospectors, identified only as "Charlie", "John" and "Fred". At some point in the springtime of 1900, Charlie received a tip-off from a Thomas Bay native on how and where to find gold there:

"He told me to go up to Thomas Bay* and camp on Patterson River on the right side, travel upriver for about 8 miles (13 km), and then turn to the high mountains, and after traveling about a mile and a half, I would find a lake shaped like a half-moon."

In late April or early May 1900, Charlie set-off with three months' worth of supplies, giving the other men instructions to send a search party for him if he did not return within that amount of time; Charlie had also stated that he would return sooner if the trip went well. When he returned in June 1900, he is said to have arrived with a large piece of quartz, much to the others' excitement, but without a coat or hat, and looking extremely disheveled. Additionally, his canoe completely empty, with none of his supplies or belongings having been brought back. Upon setting the quartz down in the men's shared cabin, Charlie is said to have requested a meal be made for him, so he may eat and retire to bed promptly. The men asked no further questions, and Charlie ate in silence before going to bed and falling into a deep sleep.

The following day, Charlie is said to have gotten dressed and promptly left, and was gone to town for much of that day. When he finally returned, he stated to the others that a ship was departing the following morning, bound for Seattle, which he wanted to join as a passenger, as he desired to "never see Alaska" or hear the words "Thomas Bay" ever again. Charlie then recommended to the other men to never go prospecting in Thomas Bay themselves, as it would only cause unwanted "mental and physical pain", and that if they could collectively pitch-in enough money for his ticket to Seattle, he would recount exactly what had happened to him on his trip.

=== Moon Lake and the devil creatures ===
Charlie claimed to have arrived in Thomas Bay after three relatively uneventful days of camping, first in Ideal Bay and then Ruth Island. When he arrived in the Thomas Bay area, he could not find the half-moon-shaped lake according to the native’s instructions. Charlie said it began raining heavily for several days, causing him to remain stuck at his campsite, where he resorted to eating and sleeping much of the time. When the weather had cleared, later that week, Charlie decided to find some grouse to hunt, and search for the lake in question in the process. He would end up hiking several miles from the campsite. Rather than a half-moon-shaped lake, he instead found and spent some time near an S-shaped lake (actually called Ess Lake). Charlie claimed that the surrounding area seemed oddly devoid of life; there were no squirrels, no birds, or any wild sounds. Wanting to get his bearings, and having found a large chunk of quartz (which he placed back in his canoe), he climbed to the top of a ridge. From that vantage point, he could spot Frederick Sound, Cape of the Straight Light, the point of Vanderput Spit (Point Vanderput), and Sukhoi Island from the mouth of Wrangell Narrows. Behind the ridge, Charlie finally spotted the half-moon shaped lake, which is where the Patterson Glacier ends at a lake which drains into the Patterson River.

It was from this point that Charlie claims that a group of "devil creatures" were making their way up the ridge from the half-moon shaped lake. Charlie claimed to have begun running back to his canoe immediately, and that he barely managed to beat the strange creatures. He also stated that he received several scratches on his back from as he managed to paddle away. He never returned to the area.

=== "Strangest Story Ever" ===
The people who have had encounters with these creatures seem to go into hysterics and are usually deemed "temporarily insane". The creatures have always been described as looking neither like man or ape, but covered with coarse hair and allegedly "oozing sores", with a foul or musky smell. They are about 4 feet (1.2 m) tall and have claw-like fingers.

In 1925, a trapper reported losing a dog in the hills around Thomas Bay, but finding strange tracks, with the hind feet resembling a cross between a bear's and a human's footprints. The trapper returned later to find the traps he had hastily left; some were sprung, some were not. Some were destroyed. He set out to try to find his dog, and was never seen again.

In 1974 Harry Colp's daughter Virginia was interviewed by writer Irving Warner in Petersburg, Alaska. She had helped her father in the production of the story, and was extremely familiar with it. She was sure of the basic veracity of her father's narrative, with regards to how he saw and lived it. She said that she could not, and would not, say whether her father′s story was true, false, or some sort of mental aberration. She did, however, express confidence in her father's abilities and truthfulness. Naturally, she had fielded many questions about it afterwards. She did say that large amounts of arsenic were alleged to be present in the watershed at Thomas Bay, which may or may not serve to explain the strange events reported by visitors. (addition by I.W.)

== See also ==
- Bigfoot
- Devil
