= USS Pilgrim (1870) =

Tugboat of the United States Navy

History

United States
- Name: USS Pilgrim
- Namesake: A pilgrim is one who journeys in foreign lands, especially to visit a shrine or holy place. The English colonists who founded Plymouth Colony, the first permanent settlement in New England, in 1620 were called pilgrims; see Pilgrim (Plymouth Colony).
- Builder: Pusey and Jones Shipbuilding Company, Wilmington, Delaware
- Launched: 1 November 1864
- Acquired: 2 March 1865
- Commissioned: 4 May 1870
- Decommissioned: 29 July 1871
- Stricken: 1 January 1889
- Fate: Sold 25 March 1891

General characteristics
- Type: Tug
- Tonnage: 170 Gross register tons
- Draft: 6 ft (1.8 m)
- Propulsion: Steam engine
- Speed: 12 knots

The second USS Pilgrim was a United States Navy tug in commission from 1870 to 1871 which may also have seen non-commissioned service in other years.

Pilgrim was an iron--hulled, steam screw tug built by the Pusey and Jones Shipbuilding Company at Wilmington, Delaware. Launched on 1 November 1864, she was delivered to the U.S. Navy on 2 March 1865.

Few records of Pilgrim's Navy service have been found. She was not ready for service until sometime after the American Civil War ended in April 1865, but no information about her service exists until she was commissioned at Key West, Florida, on 4 May 1870. She then operated primarily in the Florida Keys until the spring of 1871, when she steamed to New Orleans, Louisiana. In July 1871 she proceeded to Philadelphia, Pennsylvania, where she was decommissioned on 29 July 1871.

Pilgrim remained on the Naval Vessel Register until 1889, but no records have been found describing any service she may have had. It is possible that she saw non-commissioned service during at least part of this time, or that she remained inactive.

Pilgrim was stricken from the Naval Vessel Register on 1 January 1889 and was sold on 25 March 1891.
