= Charles Mitchell Thomas =

Charles M. Thomas
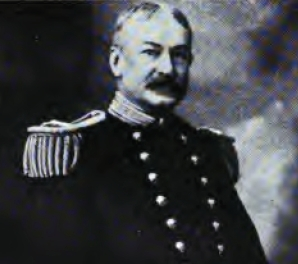
- Rear Admiral Charles Mitchell Thomas
- Born: October 1, 1846; Philadelphia, Pennsylvania
- Died: July 3, 1908 (aged 61); Monterey, California
- Military career
- Allegiance: United States of America
- Branch: United States Navy
- Service years: 1865–1908
- Rank: Rear Admiral
- Commands: USC&GS Carlile P. Patterson; USS Bennington; USS Lancaster; USS Brooklyn; USS Oregon; USS Franklin; Commandant 2nd Naval District; U.S. Atlantic Fleet, 2nd Squadron; Commander-in-Chief U.S. Atlantic Fleet

Charles Mitchell Thomas (October 1, 1846 – July 3, 1908) was a rear admiral in the United States Navy who served for 47 years. He was briefly the Commander-in-Chief of the United States Atlantic Fleet while it was in port at San Francisco, California, during the cruise of the Great White Fleet. He was born in Philadelphia, Pennsylvania, and graduated from the United States Naval Academy in 1865. He married Ruth Simpson, daughter of Admiral Edward Simpson, on 3 November 1874.

In mid-1877, unrest over economic conditions and the disputed 1876 Presidential election led to a series of railroad strikes and riots known as the Great Railroad Strike of 1877. In July, President Rutherford B. Hayes authorized the use of the military to put down the strikes. During the conflict, Thomas was given temporary command of the receiving ship USS St. Louis stationed at League Island in Philadelphia. He provided sailors to the steamer USS Glance and tug USS Pilgrim, which were used in the defense of the Frankford Arsenal in northeast Philadelphia.

As a lieutenant commander he commanded the United States Coast and Geodetic Survey survey ship USC&GS Carlile P. Patterson from 1887 to 1889, mapping out portions of the Alaska coast and naming prominent features in Southeast Alaska. Thomas Bay, which he surveyed, was named in his honor.

During the cruise of the Great White Fleet, Thomas was second-in-command behind Rear Admiral Robley D. Evans. Shortly after the beginning of the first leg of the cruise, Evans fell ill and Thomas served in his stead at diplomatic functions during the cruise. Beginning in February 1908, Thomas was officially made acting commander-in-chief of the fleet when Evans was transported to San Francisco for treatment. On 9 May 1908, Evans was formally replaced by Thomas as commander-in-chief. Five days later, Thomas retired from active duty and command was transferred to Rear Admiral Charles S. Sperry for the second leg of the voyage.

Military offices
Preceded by Robley Dunglison Evans	Commander-in-Chief of the U.S. Atlantic Fleet; May 9, 1908 – May 15, 1908	Succeeded by Charles Stillman Sperry
