= USS Paul Jones (DD-10) =

Bainbridge-class destroyer

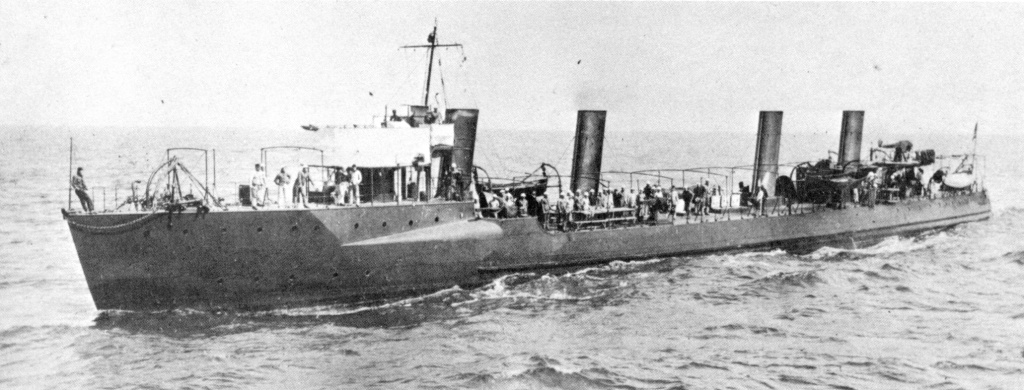
- Shown in 1905 in the Pacific Ocean, USS Paul Jones was completed with a high forecastle for improved sea-keeping characteristics. The two set of stacks indicate that the boiler rooms are separated by their engine room, which should improve her survivability in a battle, as one hit would not disable all of her boilers.

History

United States
- Name: Paul Jones
- Namesake: Captain John Paul Jones awarded Continental Congress Gold Medals
- Builder: Union Iron Works, San Francisco
- Laid down: 20 April 1899
- Launched: 14 June 1900
- Commissioned: 19 July 1902
- Decommissioned: 29 July 1919
- Stricken: 15 September 1919
- Fate: Sold, 3 January 1920 and broken up for scrap

General characteristics
- Class & type: Bainbridge-class destroyer
- Displacement: 420 long tons (430 t) (standard); 592 long tons (601 t) (full load)
- Length: 245 ft (74.7 m) (pp); 250 ft (76.2 m) (oa)
- Beam: 23 ft 7 in (7.2 m)
- Draft: 6 ft 6 in (2 m) (mean)
- Installed power: 4 × Thornycroft boilers; 8,000 ihp (6,000 kW)
- Propulsion: 2 × Vertical triple expansion engines; 2 × Propellers
- Speed: 29 kn (54 km/h; 33 mph) (designed speed)
- Complement: 3 officers; 72 enlisted men
- Armament: 2 × 3 in (76 mm)/50 caliber guns; 5 × 6-pounder (57 mm (2.2 in)) guns; 2 × 18 in (457 mm) torpedo tubes

The second USS Paul Jones was a Bainbridge-class destroyer in the United States Navy. She was named for John Paul Jones.

== Construction ==
Paul Jones was laid down on 20 April 1899, by the Union Iron Works of San Francisco; launched on 14 June 1902; sponsored by Mrs. Elizabeth Goldsborough Adams; and commissioned on 19 July 1902.

Originally built as a torpedo boat destroyer, Paul Jones served in the Pacific Fleet, homeported at San Francisco. A unit of the Pacific Torpedo Fleet, she was at San Francisco at the beginning of World War I.

== World War I ==
Paul Jones sailed on 23 April 1917, for Norfolk, Virginia, via San Diego, Acapulco, the Panama Canal Zone, and Guantanamo Bay, Cuba, arriving on 3 August. On 4 August, she took station off the York River on patrol assignment until joining Duncan, Henley, Truxtun, Stewart, Preble, Hull, Macdonough, and Hopkins as escorts for Battleship Force, Atlantic Fleet, on 13 August, for passage to Bermuda and New York.

Paul Jones departed the Brooklyn Navy Yard on 24 August and reported to Newport, Rhode Island where she began a series of convoy patrols up and down the coast and returning to Newport on 24 September. She then commenced training operations, in conjunction with other duties, off Norfolk, Lynnhaven Roads, and Chesapeake Bay, prior to reporting to Philadelphia on 20 December.

On 15 January 1918, in company with Stewart, Hopkins and Worden, Paul Jones sailed for the Azores by way of Bermuda. After departing Bermuda, she had to request permission to turn back due to a serious leak in her port after bunker. From 23–26 January, Paul Jones' crew struggled against great odds and succeeded in saving the ship from sinking. Wallowing in stormy seas with her after fire room flooded, barely able to maintain headway, having lost all drinking and feed water and steaming under two boilers with salt feed, manning bucket brigades for lack of operable pumps, and receiving no answers to her distress signals, she finally sighted a light off St. David's Head, Bermuda, signalled the fort for assistance and dropped her anchor.

Paul Jones remained at Bermuda until 22 February for repairs and then sailed for Philadelphia escorted by Mars arriving on 25 February. Following permanent repairs at the Philadelphia Navy Yard, Paul Jones reported to Fortress Monroe, Virginia on 18 April, and performed various duties in and around the Chesapeake Bay until 6 August.

The highlight of Paul Jones' career came on 2 July when Henderson was on fire in the Atlantic north of Bermuda and east of Virginia. Paul Jones made four trips from the burning ship to Von Steuben saving 1,250 Marines and officers together with over 50 tons of luggage. The next day she accompanied Henderson to Delaware Breakwater.

Paul Jones was involved in a friendly fire incident in the Atlantic Ocean in August 1918. She was escorting a convoy of 28 cargo ships on 7 August when at 15:00 the last ship in the convoy, the American armed cargo ship SS Jason, which was slightly behind the rest of the convoy's ships, sighted the U.S. Navy submarine USS O-6 on the surface behind the convoy and mistook her for a German submarine with a mast and sail set. U.S. Navy gunners aboard Jason opened fire on O-6 with Jason′s 5-inch (127 mm) gun at a range of 3,000 yards (2,740 m). Jason fired eight rounds, scoring five hits. After the first hit, O-6 attempted to dive, but the second hit struck her conning tower and started leaks that made it impossible for her to submerge. O-6 blew her ballast tanks and returned to the surface. She flashed recognition signals by blinker light and members of her crew waved a United States flag on her deck. Jason reported that O-6 fired six shots from her deck gun at Jason, apparently misinterpreting O-6′s recognition signals as gun flashes. Another of the convoy's cargo ships also opened fire, and shell splashes from that ship's gunfire fell short of O-6 and may have appeared to Jason′s crew and gunners to have come from O-6. O-6 stopped, and Jason ceased fire as she steamed out of range of O-6. Paul Jones meanwhile had reversed course and approached Jason, which signaled that she had a submarine in sight. Paul Jones then closed with O-6 and opened 3-inch (76.2 mm) gunfire, but all of her shots fell short, and she ceased fire when she closed to a range of 3,000 yards (2,700 m) and saw that O-6 was flying a U.S. flag from her conning tower. Paul Jones came alongside O-6 to render assistance. O-6 suffered no casualties, but she had sustained serious damage, including to her compasses — which had been knocked out — and her steering gear. Paul Jones escorted her to port at the Delaware Breakwater, where they arrived on 8 August 1918.

Paul Jones reported at Hampton Roads, Virginia, on 9 August 1918 and remained in and around the Chesapeake Bay conducting mine patrols, convoy duties, and other services until slated for inactivation on 31 January 1919. She decommissioned on 29 July; was struck from the Naval Vessel Register on 15 September; and was sold on 3 January 1920 to Henry A. Hitner's Sons Company, Philadelphia, who subsequently scrapped her.

== Noteworthy commanding officers ==
- Lieutenant Edgar Brown Larimer (15 January 1907-11 July 1907) (later a rear admiral and Chief of the Bureau of Ordnance (1931-1934))
- Lieutenant William A. Glassford (September 1911-May 1912, 1 February 1916-October 1916) (later a vice admiral)
- Lieutenant Leo Hewlett Thebaud (1918-29 July 1919) (later a vice admiral)
