= USS Worden (DD-16) =

Truxtun-class destroyer

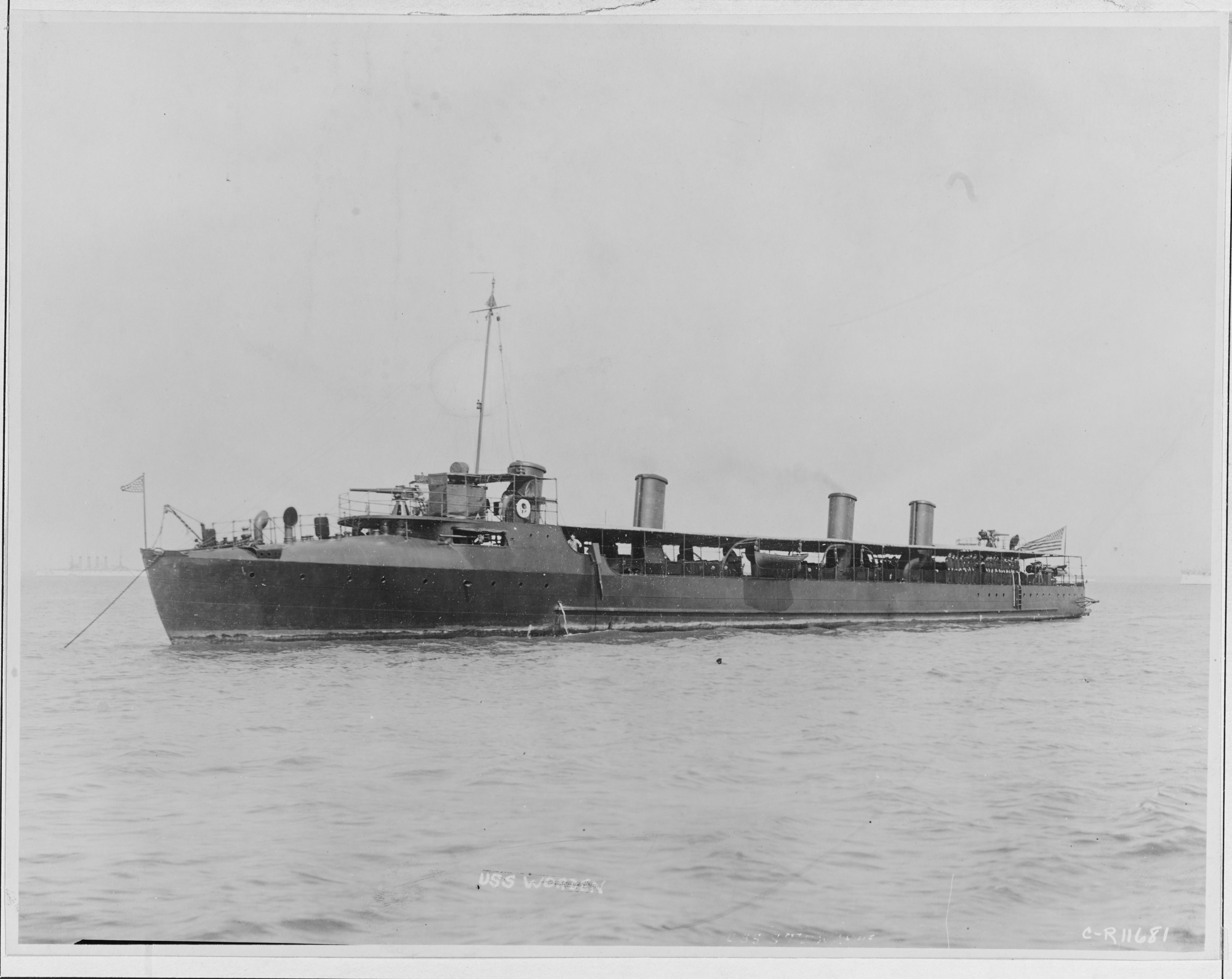
- USS Worden (DD-16) at anchor, possibly in the Hampton Roads, Virginia, area in 1907.

History

United States
- Name: Worden
- Namesake: Rear admiral John Lorimer Worden
- Builder: Maryland Steel Company Sparrows Point, Maryland
- Laid down: 13 November 1899
- Launched: 15 August 1901
- Sponsored by: Mrs. Daniel F. Worden, the daughter-in-law of Rear Admiral Worden
- Commissioned: 17 March 1903
- Decommissioned: 13 July 1919
- Stricken: 15 September 1919
- Identification: Hull symbol: DD-16
- Fate: Sold for merchant service, 3 January 1920. Either lost, 1 May 1947, or scrapped, 1956.

General characteristics
- Class & type: Truxtun-class destroyer
- Displacement: 433 long tons (440 t) normal, 605 long tons (615 t) full load
- Length: 259 ft 6 in (79.10 m)
- Beam: 23 ft 3 in (7.09 m)
- Draft: 9 ft 10 in (3.00 m)
- Propulsion: 4 × boilers, 2 × Vertical expansion engines, 8,300 ihp (6,200 kW); 2 × screws
- Speed: 29.6 kn (34.1 mph; 54.8 km/h)
- Complement: 3 Officers; 75 Enlisted
- Armament: 2 × 3 in (76 mm)/50 caliber guns; 6 × 6-pounder 57 mm (2.2 in) guns; 2 × 18 inch (450 mm) torpedo tubes

The first USS Worden (DD-16) was a Truxtun-class destroyer in the United States Navy. She was named for Admiral John Lorimer Worden. It was the first US ship equipped with a stabilizer.

== Built in Sparrows Point, Maryland ==
Worden was laid down at Sparrows Point, Maryland, on 13 November 1899 by the Maryland Steel Company; launched on 15 August 1901; sponsored by Mrs. Daniel F. Worden, the daughter-in-law of Rear Admiral Worden; and commissioned on 17 March 1903.

== Pre-World War I ==
Worden passed her final acceptance test on 18 July and began duty with the 2nd Torpedo Flotilla, based at Norfolk, Virginia. For more than four years, she remained a unit of the 2nd Torpedo Flotilla and conducted operations along the eastern seaboard from Maine south to the Caribbean and the Gulf of Mexico. Annually, she participated in the Fleet maneuvers held in the warm waters of the Caribbean.

On 18 November 1907, the warship was placed in reserve at the Norfolk Navy Yard. As a unit of the Reserve Torpedo Flotilla, she was berthed first at Norfolk and, later, at Charleston, South Carolina. Save for a six-month interlude from May to November 1909 when she was returned to full commission, Worden remained inactive until 1912. Then, though still in reserve, she was loaned to the Pennsylvania Naval Militia for training purposes and was stationed at Philadelphia until returned to Charleston and the Reserve Torpedo Flotilla the following year.

Sometime in 1914, the torpedo-boat destroyer became a tender to the Atlantic Fleet Submarine Force and continued to operate in support of submarines until sometime in March 1917 when she was sent to New York on special duty in connection with a recruiting campaign necessitated by the probability that the United States would enter World War I. In June, she was reassigned back to her own type command as a unit of Division B, Destroyer Force; however, she continued her recruiting duty at New York through the end of the year.

== World War I ==
On 16 January 1918, Worden got underway for Europe in company with Hopkins, Macdonough, Paul Jones, and Stewart. She steamed with them - via Bermuda - to Ponta Delgada in the Azores, where she arrived on 29 January. There, Worden and Stewart parted company with the other three warships and were put to sea again on 4 February to continue on to the French coast. They reached Brest on the 9th and soon thereafter began escorting coastal convoys and hunting for enemy U-boats. During the remaining nine months of World War I, Worden maintained a grueling schedule escorting convoys between ports on the French coast.

== Inter-war period ==
On 18 December 1918, about five weeks after the 11 November armistice, she stood out of Brest in company with Flusser, Stewart, and Whipple to return home. Following refueling and provisioning stops in the Azores and at Bermuda, she and her traveling companions arrived at Philadelphia on 3 January 1919. She remained in commission for a little over six months, probably at Philadelphia. In any event, Worden was placed out of commission there on 13 July, and her name was struck from the Naval Vessel Register on 15 September. In 1920, on the first anniversary of her return home, 3 January, she was sold to Henry A. Hitner's Sons Company of Philadelphia for conversion to mercantile service.

Worden retained her former name while in mercantile service. On 1 May 1942, she was steaming off the Florida coast when the nearby British freighter La Paz, en route from Liverpool, England, and Hampton Roads, VA, to Valparaiso, Chile, was torpedoed by the German submarine U-109 (Kapitänleutnant Heinrich Bleichrodt). Worden stood by the damaged vessel and towed her toward Jacksonville. Although Bleichrodt claimed both ships as sunk, Worden with a torpedo meant for La Paz, both ships survived, La Paz salvaged and resuming service, the fruit carrier continuing in that trade into the post-war period.

== Noteworthy commanding officers ==
- Ensign William R. Munroe (1912-Unknown) (Later Vice admiral)
- Lieutenant commander Oscar C. Badger II (August 1918-October 1918) (Later Admiral)

== Bibliography ==
- Eger, Christopher L. (2012). "Hudson-Fulton Naval Celebration, Part I". Warship International. XLIX (2): 123–151. ISSN 0043-0374.
- Eger, Christopher L. (March 2021). "Hudson Fulton Celebration, Part II". Warship International. LVIII (1): 58–81. ISSN 0043-0374.
- Sieche, Erwin F. (1990). "Austria-Hungary's Last Visit to the USA". Warship International. XXVII (2): 142–164. ISSN 0043-0374.
- Leopold, Reuven (December 1977). "Innovation adoption in naval ship design". Naval Engineers Journal. 89 (6): 35–42. doi:10.1111/j.1559-3584.1977.tb05537.x. eISSN 1559-3584. hdl:1721.1/16291. ISSN 0028-1425.
