= USS Truxtun (DD-14) =

Truxtun-class destroyer

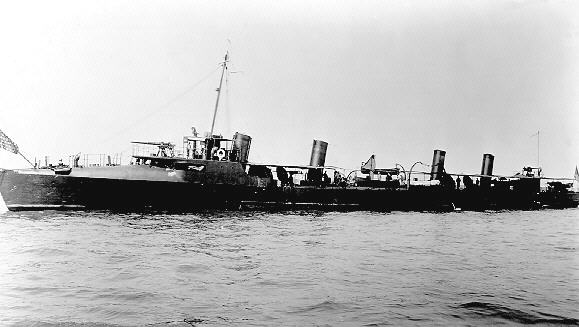
- USS Truxtun (DD-14)

History

United States
- Name: Truxtun
- Namesake: Commodore Thomas Truxtun awarded Congressional Gold Medal
- Builder: Maryland Steel Company Sparrows Point, Maryland
- Laid down: 13 November 1899
- Launched: 15 August 1901
- Sponsored by: Miss Isabelle Truxtun, grand daughter of Commodore Tuxtun
- Commissioned: 11 September 1902
- Decommissioned: 18 July 1919
- Stricken: 15 September 1919
- Identification: Hull symbol: DD-14
- Fate: Sold for merchant service, 3 January 1920, scrapped 1956

General characteristics
- Class & type: Truxtun-class destroyer
- Displacement: 433 long tons (440 t) normal, 605 long tons (615 t) full load
- Length: 259 ft 6 in (79.10 m)
- Beam: 23 ft 3 in (7.09 m)
- Draft: 9 ft 10 in (3.00 m)
- Propulsion: 4 × boilers, 2 × Vertical expansion engines, 8,300 ihp (6,200 kW); 2 × screws
- Speed: 29.6 kn (34.1 mph; 54.8 km/h)
- Complement: 3 Officers; 75 Enlisted
- Armament: 2 × 3 in (76 mm)/50 caliber guns; 6 × 6-pounder 57 mm (2.2 in) guns; 2 × 18 inch (450 mm) torpedo tubes

The second USS Truxtun (DD-14) was the lead ship of Truxtun-class destroyers in the United States Navy. She was named for Commodore Thomas Truxtun.

Truxtun was laid down on 13 November 1899 at Sparrows Point, Maryland, by the Maryland Steel Company; launched on 15 August 1901; sponsored by Miss Isabelle Truxtun; and commissioned on 11 September 1902.

== Pre-World War I ==
Upon commissioning, Truxtun was assigned to the 2nd Torpedo Flotilla, and her commanding officer was appointed commander of the flotilla. She conducted trials out of Norfolk until 14 January 1903 and received her final acceptance on 24 April. In August, she participated in maneuvers off Frenchman Bay, Maine, in the Presidential review by Theodore Roosevelt at Oyster Bay, and in a joint Army-Navy exercise off Portland, Maine.

On 26 September, the 2nd Torpedo Flotilla became a unit of the Coast Squadron, North Atlantic Fleet. Truxtun joined that squadron in target practice off the Massachusetts coast before returning to Norfolk later that fall for repairs.

For the next four years, Truxtun operated along the Atlantic coast and in the Caribbean. On 31 October 1905 she ran into a barge in a very minor collision at Norfolk, Virginia. In December 1907, she and five other destroyers assembled in Hampton Roads with the battleships of the Atlantic Fleet. President Roosevelt reviewed the fleet once more and then, this "Great White Fleet" passed between Capes Charles and Henry to embark upon its famous round-the-world voyage. Truxtun escorted the fleet on the first leg of its voyage, going as far as the west coast. Along the way, she visited ports in Brazil, Chile, Peru, Panama, and Mexico. The fleet reached San Francisco in May 1908, and the destroyers were detached and reassigned to the Pacific Torpedo Fleet, an organization not administratively assigned to the Pacific Fleet. After repairs at Mare Island Navy Yard that summer, Truxtun joined her sister destroyers in a training voyage to Hawaii and Samoa. She returned to the west coast at San Diego, her new base of operations, early in December. She began her duty along the Pacific coast of North America with a voyage to Alaskan waters, visiting Seattle, Sitka, Seward, Skagway, and Juneau.

Truxtun remained in the Pacific until the summer of 1917. During the intervening period, she continued to be active with the Pacific Torpedo Fleet making cruises out of San Diego. On 25 March 1912, the Pacific Reserve Fleet was established under the command of Rear Admiral Alfred Reynolds. This organization was established in response to severe manpower shortages and was not similar in any respect to the contemporary reserve or "mothball" fleet. By 1 June, Truxtun joined the Pacific Reserve Fleet; however, she remained somewhat active, periodically putting to sea to check her machinery and to maintain herself "...in constant readiness for sea."

Her reserve status was short-lived. She was placed back in full commission on 12 October and resumed normal activity along the coast. On two occasions, in the summer of 1914 and again in the summer of 1916, the torpedo boat destroyer steamed to Mexican waters to protect American interests during the series of political convulsions that plagued that nation during the second decade of the twentieth century. By July 1916, she had returned to semi-inactivity as a unit of the reserve division of the Coast Torpedo Force — later re-designated Division 2 (Reserve), Coast Torpedo Force. As before, however, she conducted sporadic cruises along the California coast to maintain herself in a state of readiness.

== World War I ==
On 18 February 1917, Truxtun was returned to full commission for the third and final time. Initially, she was assigned to patrol duty in the area of the Panama Canal. On 6 April, the day the United States entered World War I, she departed Colon harbor and headed south to Puerto Colombia, Colombia, where she watched the German ship SS Prinz August Wilhelm which was anchored in the harbor. She was relieved by Stewart on 14 April and returned to Colon the following day. For almost three months, she patrolled the Pacific coastal waters of Panama and Colombia, periodically doubling as a submarine tender. On Independence Day 1917, she transited the Panama Canal and, the following day, departed Balboa, Panama, in company with Stewart, Preble, and Whipple. The four destroyers reached Hampton Roads on 13 July. Through the end of August, Truxtun patrolled Chesapeake Bay and conducted maneuvers off the coast. She made port calls at New York and Philadelphia, on one occasion acting in the escort for Texas.

On 31 August, Truxtun departed Philadelphia for duty in the Azores. After a short stop-over in Bermuda, she arrived at Ponta Delgada on 16 September. The destroyer operated from Ponta Delgada until early December. She and Whipple met SS Caproni on 30 September and escorted her into Ponta Delgada on 3 October. In mid-October, she made a short voyage to Funchal, Madeira, and back. Later that month, she participated in a search for the survivors of a torpedoed ship. Truxtun cleared Ponta Delgada on 6 December and headed — via Gibraltar — for France. She reached Brest on 15 December. Operating from that port, the destroyer convoyed merchant ships and conducted patrols against German U-boats for the remainder of World War I.

During the ensuing year, she experienced two adventures. The first came on the night of 17 April 1918 when the explosives-laden steamship SS Florence H. exploded into flame in Quiberon Bay. For steering his destroyer into the flaming seas surrounding the stricken munitions carrier and helping to rescue many of her crewmen, Truxtun's commanding officer, Lieutenant Ware, was awarded the Distinguished Service Medal. Her second scrape involved the enemy. At about 0900 on 18 May, while escorting a convoy, she sighted an underwater disturbance and immediately charged to the attack. The warship dropped several patterns of depth charges and fired several rounds from her guns. However, many of the depth charges failed to function properly. The U-boat, believed to have been UC-56, made good her escape; and Truxtun returned to the convoy at about 0930.

Just over a month after the armistice ended World War I, Truxtun bade farewell to Europe. Departing Brest on 18 December in company with Flusser, Stewart, Whipple, and Worden, she steamed, via Ponta Delgada and Bermuda, back to the United States. She entered the Delaware River on 3 January 1919 and was decommissioned at Philadelphia on 18 July. Her name was struck from the Naval Vessel Register on 15 September. She was sold to Henry A. Hitner's Sons Company of Philadelphia on 3 January 1920 for conversion to mercantile service as a motor fruit carrier. She was scrapped in 1956.

== Noteworthy commanding officer ==
- Lieutenant Daniel J. Callaghan (5 September 1915-11 Nov 1916) (Later Rear admiral)

== Bibliography ==
- Sieche, Erwin F. (1990). "Austria-Hungary's Last Visit to the USA". Warship International. XXVII (2): 142–164. ISSN 0043-0374.
