= USS Stewart (DD-13) =

Bainbridge-class destroyer

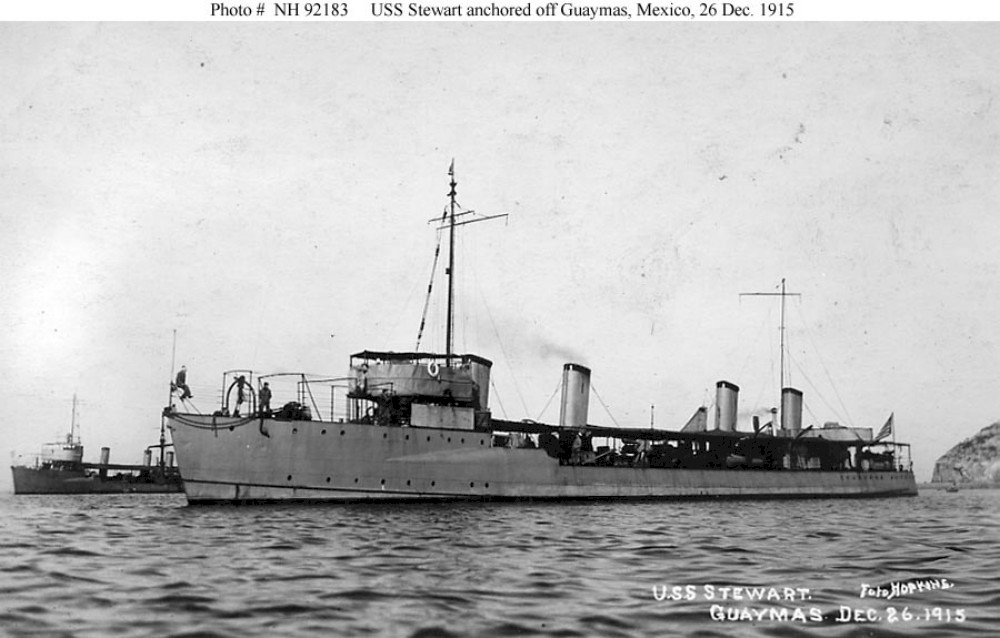
- USS Stewart, anchored off Guaymas, Mexico, 26 December 1915. Preble is partially visible in the left background.

History

United States
- Name: Stewart
- Namesake: Rear admiral Charles Stewart
- Builder: Gas Engine & Power Company
- Laid down: 24 January 1900
- Launched: 10 May 1902
- Commissioned: 17 December 1902
- Decommissioned: 9 July 1919
- Stricken: 15 September 1919
- Fate: Sold, 3 January 1920 and scrapped

General characteristics
- Class & type: Bainbridge-class destroyer
- Displacement: 420 long tons (430 t) (standard); 592 long tons (601 t) (full load)
- Length: 245 ft (74.7 m) (pp); 250 ft (76.2 m) (oa)
- Beam: 23 ft 7 in (7.2 m)
- Draft: 6 ft 6 in (2 m) (mean)
- Installed power: 4 × Thornycroft boilers; 8,000 ihp (6,000 kW)
- Propulsion: 2 × Vertical triple expansion engines; 2 × Propellers
- Speed: 29 kn (54 km/h; 33 mph) (designed speed)
- Complement: 3 officers; 72 enlisted men
- Armament: 2 × 3 in (76 mm)/50 caliber guns; 5 × 6-pounder (57 mm (2.2 in)) guns; 2 × 18 in (457 mm) torpedo tubes

The first USS Stewart was a Bainbridge-class destroyer in the United States Navy. She was named for Rear Admiral Charles Stewart.

== Construction ==
Stewart was laid down on 24 January 1900, at Morris Heights, New York, by the Gas Engine and Power Company; launched on 10 May 1902; sponsored by Mrs. Paul Lee Cocke, granddaughter of Rear Admiral Stewart; and commissioned on 1 December 1902.

== Pre-World War I ==
After commissioning, Stewart served for a short time at the Naval Academy and then joined the Coast Squadron of the North Atlantic Fleet. In 1906, she was placed in reserve at Norfolk, Virginia but was recommissioned in 1907 in the Atlantic Fleet and transferred in 1908 to the Pacific Fleet. As one of the first group of destroyers built in the United States, Stewart quickly became obsolete; and, on 24 February 1916, the Navy Department decided that destroyers numbered 1 through 16 were "no longer serviceable for duty with the fleet." These ships were henceforth classed as "coast torpedo vessels", but this did not prevent Stewart from having an active career in World War I.

== World War I ==
After the United States declared war on Germany on 6 April 1917, Stewart patrolled first off the Atlantic entrance to the Panama Canal and along the Colombian coast; and then, after 11 May, off the Pacific entrance to the canal. On 5 July, she returned to the Atlantic, and was fitted out at the Philadelphia Navy Yard from 22 July-11 August for distant service.

On 13 August, she sailed for the British Imperial fortress colony of Bermuda with a destroyer flotilla; but, on arrival on 16 August, she grounded in the harbor and required repairs at the Royal Naval Dockyard there and at Philadelphia, Pennsylvania which lasted through 10 October. On 11 October, Stewart began dispatch and escort duty from a base in the York River. Except for one interruption for training, this duty continued until 31 December 1917, when she entered the Philadelphia yard to fit out again for distant service.

Departing the yard on 15 January 1918, Stewart sailed the next day for Europe in company with Worden, Hopkins, Macdonough, and Paul Jones. Stopping in the Azores from 29 January-4 February, Stewart and Worden arrived at Brest, France, on the 9th and began convoy escort duty off that port on the 17th.

On 17 April, as Stewart entered Quiberon Bay, an American steamer, Florence H, with a cargo of powder and steel, exploded in the anchorage. Stewart saved nine survivors, and her crew was cited by the Secretary of the Navy for gallantry during the rescue. On 23 April, Stewart sighted two seaplanes dropping bombs, apparently on a submarine; and she raced to the spot. One aircraft flew over the destroyer, and the observer pointed to the location of the sub. Stewart saw first the sub's wake, then its periscope, and finally the dark form of her hull underwater. She was forced to turn away at the last moment due to the effort of a French escort to ram the sub, but dropped two depth charges which brought up large amounts of oil. The action was evaluated at the time as a kill; but the submarine, U-108, survived to be damaged by Porter several days later and finally to surrender at Harwich at the end of the war.

During a dense fog three days later, Stewart was damaged when she collided with an unidentified merchantman, and she remained under repair until 28 May. On 4 August, the destroyer made another attack on an apparent submarine wake, but obtained no evidence of success.

== Inter-war period ==
After the armistice ending World War I was signed on 11 November, Stewart ceased convoy duty; and she entered drydock at Brest on 26 November for repairs. On 9 December, she departed Brest with four other destroyers; and, after passing the convoy carrying President Woodrow Wilson to Europe two days later and subsequently making stops at the Azores and Bermuda, the destroyers arrived at Philadelphia on 3 January 1919. Decommissioned on 9 July, Stewart was struck from the Naval Vessel Register on 15 September, and sold on 3 January 1920 to Henry A. Hitner's Sons Company, Philadelphia, for scrap.

== Noteworthy commanding officer ==
- Lieutenant Julius Frederick Hellweg (11 May 1907 – 28 May 1908) (Later Rear Admiral)

== Bibliography ==
- Sieche, Erwin F. (1990). "Austria-Hungary's Last Visit to the USA". Warship International. XXVII (2): 142–164. ISSN 0043-0374.
