= USS Wheeling (PG-14) =

Gunboat of the United States Navy

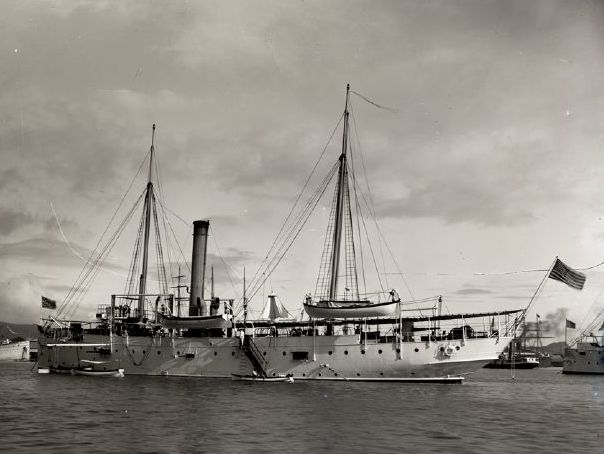
- USS Wheeling (PG-14) at the Mare Island Navy Yard, California, c. August 1897.

History

United States
- Name: USS Wheeling
- Namesake: A city on the Ohio border of West Virginia's panhandle. Wheeling is the seat of government for Ohio County.
- Builder: Union Iron Works, San Francisco, California
- Laid down: 11 April 1896
- Launched: 18 March 1897
- Sponsored by: Miss Lucie S. Brown
- Commissioned: 10 August 1897 as USS Wheeling, Gunboat No. 14
- Decommissioned: 1 July 1904 at Bremerton, Washington
- In service: 3 May 1910
- Out of service: 13 February 1946
- Renamed: Designated PG-14, 17 July 1920
- Reclassified: as an Unclassified Miscellaneous Auxiliary, IX-28, 21 January 1923
- Stricken: 28 March 1946
- Home port: New York City
- Fate: Sold for scrap 5 October 1946

General characteristics
- Class & type: Wheeling-class gunboat
- Displacement: 990 tons (fl)
- Length: 189 ft 7 in (57.79 m)
- Beam: 34 ft (10 m)
- Draft: 12 ft 10 in (3.91 m)
- Speed: 12 knots
- Complement: 140
- Armament: Six 4-inch guns; Four 6-pounder rifles; Two 1-pounder guns; One Colt machine gun

USS Wheeling (PG-14) was a Wheeling-class gunboat acquired by the United States Navy in 1897. She served as a gunboat during the Spanish–American War as well as a convoy escort during World War I. As IX-28 she also served as a schoolship for the training of Naval Reservists, and, at the end of World War II, just before being struck from the Navy records, she was temporarily assigned as a barracks ship for torpedo boat crews.

== Construction ==
The first ship to be so named by the U.S. Navy, Wheeling (Gunboat No. 14) was laid down on 11 April 1896 at San Francisco, California, by the Union Iron Works; launched on 18 March 1897; sponsored by Miss Lucie S. Brown; and commissioned on 10 August 1897.

== Spanish–American War service ==
Following a cruise to the Hawaiian Islands in the fall of 1897, Wheeling reported for duty in the northern Pacific Ocean and spent the entire period of the Spanish–American War patrolling the Alaskan coast and the Aleutian Islands. The vessel sustained major hull damage during patrols off the coast of Alaska.

== Far East operations ==
In the spring of 1899, the gunboat was ordered to the Far East to reinforce the American fleet supporting operations to suppress the Philippine–American War. Until the spring of 1900, the gunboat patrolled the islands, enforced the blockade, convoyed troop transports, and helped the United States Army maintain communications between its units operating on various islands of the archipelago.

When the Boxer Rebellion broke out in March 1900, Wheeling departed the Philippine Islands to patrol the northern coast of China. From 23 March to 9 May, she cruised the Chinese coast observing conditions in that strife-torn nation as she attempted to persuade Chinese officials to respect and protect foreigners resident in China. She and ships of European navies with similar missions spent most of their time at Taku, essentially the port city for Tientsin and Peking.

On 9 May, she departed Taku and headed home, via Yokohama, Japan. The gunboat laid over at Yokohama from the 13th to the 22d and then headed back across the Pacific to North America. From early June to late August, she operated in the Aleutian Islands out of Dutch Harbor. On 25 August, she departed Dutch Harbor for a leisurely cruise south. Along the way, she visited a number of Alaskan ports and did not reach Bremerton, Washington, until 11 December. By 19 December, Wheeling was at Mare Island, California, conducting oceanographic surveys in that vicinity.

== Assigned as Samoan station ship ==
The gunboat operated at Mare Island until the beginning of 1902, at which time she received orders to American Samoa for duty as station ship. After a cruise to Hawaii and the Philippines, Wheeling arrived in Samoa late in May. From that time until midyear 1904, the gunboat cruised the Samoan group—erecting signal installations, performing survey work, and transporting passengers between the islands.

On one occasion in January 1903, she transported Dr. Wilhelm Solf—then governor of German Samoa and later foreign minister of Germany in Prince Max von Baden's interim government at the end of World War I—and his staff from Pago Pago to Apia. The warship continued her duties in the Samoan islands until 15 June 1904 at which time she set course for the United States. On 1 July, she was decommissioned at Bremerton, Washington, and was berthed at the Puget Sound Navy Yard.

== Reassigned to the Atlantic Ocean ==
After almost six years of inactivity, Wheeling was recommissioned at Puget Sound on 3 May 1910. In June, she made a brief cruise in Alaskan waters before starting on a voyage to Portsmouth, New Hampshire, in company with Petrel. During that voyage, she nearly circumnavigated the globe.

Departing the west coast on 17 June, Wheeling sailed via Yokohama, Japan, and Singapore to the southern terminus of the Suez Canal. After transiting the canal, she steamed westward across the Mediterranean Sea, stopping at Genoa, Italy, and at the British colony at Gibraltar. On her way across the Atlantic, Wheeling made one stop—at Hamilton, Bermuda—before arriving in Portsmouth, New Hampshire, on 22 November.

== Caribbean operations ==
Following voyage repairs, the gunboat embarked upon almost six years of duty patrolling the troubled waters of the West Indies and the Gulf of Mexico. By mid-January 1911, she was operating along the Central American coast. During 1911 and 1912, she made numerous port visits in the Caribbean Sea while engaging in training operations. On 15 July 1913, the gunboat anchored in the vicinity of Vera Cruz and Tampico, Mexico, to investigate reports of violence against Americans living there and remained to protect American property.

From 15 February to 7 March 1914, she plied waters off the Republic of Haiti to protect American citizens against guerrilla terrorists fighting the government, and from 7 to 13 March she was at Puerto Plata, Santo Domingo, with the President of Santo Domingo on board. When the threat of violence against Americans loomed at Vera Cruz once again in mid-1914, Wheeling sailed to that port and landed a force to protect Americans during the period 25 April to 30 June. Upon being detached from duty in Mexico, Wheeling proceeded to Portsmouth, New Hampshire, for repairs.

She returned to the West Indies in mid-October 1914 and took station off the Republic of Haiti. During 1915, Wheeling cruised between Haiti, Cuba, and Mexico showing the American flag for the benefit of various political groups in each country which were attempting to terrorize resident Americans.

She patrolled the Mexican coast near Vera Cruz from 23 March to 16 June 1916 to aid Americans in case of any disturbances, and put in at Puerto Mexico, Mexico, on 17 June to embark American refugees driven from their homes by bandits. Wheeling remained in port six days and then sailed to Carmen, Mexico, where she anchored from 25 to 29 June and took on board more displaced Americans. The gunboat joined United States Army transport Sumner at Vera Cruz on 29 June 1916 and transferred her passengers to that ship. Between 9 October and 16 December 1916, Wheeling returned to the waters off Vera Cruz to provide naval gunfire support to Army units operating ashore against Mexican bandits.

== World War I service ==
The beginning of 1917 found the warship still cruising the Mexican coast. When the United States entered World War I on 6 April, she rode at anchor at Vera Cruz. Later that month, she moved to Tampico, continuing her service with the Mexican patrol force until early in July. On the 10th, she headed for New Orleans, Louisiana, where she arrived on the 13th. After two weeks of extensive preparations for overseas service, the gunboat stood out of New Orleans on 31 July. After a stop at Key West, Florida, on 2 August, she continued her voyage to Hampton Roads, Virginia, where she arrived on the 6th.

=== European operations ===
Wheeling cleared Hampton Roads on the 8th and shaped a course for Ponta Delgada in the Azores. Two days out to sea, she suffered a severe battering while trying to ride out a hurricane. The damage forced her return to the United States for repairs, and she entered the New York Navy Yard on 11 August.

Following 18 days of repairs, she put to sea again, bound for Lewes, Delaware. Wheeling rendezvoused with destroyers Truxtun and Whipple there, and together, the three warships headed east on the 31st. The little group of ships stopped at Bermuda from 3 to 8 September then continued their voyage to Ponta Delgada where they arrived on the 16th.

For the next seven months, the gunboat operated out of Ponta Delgada with the Patrol Force Azores Detachment. For the most part, she conducted uneventful patrols and convoyed Allied shipping between the Azores Islands and the Madeira Islands. On 15 April 1918, she stood out of Ponta Delgada bound for Gibraltar. After a brief stop in the Canary Islands on the 19th, Wheeling arrived at the great British naval base on 22 April.

=== Antisubmarine operations ===
For the remainder of the war, she operated out of Gibraltar escorting convoys between that place, Bizerte in North Africa, and Genoa in Italy. On 11 May, the convoy she was escorting lost one ship, SS Susette Fraisinette, to a torpedo fired by UB-52, which, in turn, was later sunk by the British submarine H-4 while attempting to return to her base at Cattaro. Six days later on 17 May, another of her convoy's ships was lost to the combined efforts of U-39 and UB-50.

The first hint of trouble came at about 1848 that evening when SS Sculptor exploded, the victim of a torpedo from U-39. Wheeling went to general quarters immediately and rang up full speed. Initially, she concentrated on collecting the ships of the convoy, all of which had scattered in panic. At about 1915, a lookout reported a submarine off the starboard bow, and Wheeling charged to the attack. She circled to the spot at which the supposed U-boat had last been seen and marked the location with a calcium light. From there, she circled outward dropping a total of six depth charges—two of which failed to detonate.

While Wheeling had been engaged in hunting U-39 and in collecting the scattered convoy, UB-50 joined the fracas. At about 2016, the American warship witnessed a flash, then heard a report, to her port side, as UB-50's torpedo slammed into SS Mavisbrook. The gunboat stopped her engines and began rescue operations. Over the side went two Franklin life buoys, two balsam rafts, and a dozen life belts. Just as she prepared to lower one of her boats to continue rescue duty, Surveyor appeared on the scene, assumed rescue duty, and released Wheeling to resume protection and collection of the convoy.

For the remainder of the night, Wheeling listened to shots being fired sporadically but did not leave station. Unknown to the gunboat, UB-50 also scored a hit on SS Elswick Grange, but the English steamer succeeded in making port under her own power. The convoy continued its voyage to Bizerte unmolested and reached port on 21 May. Upon arrival, Wheeling learned that severe damage had forced one of the two submarines which had attacked the convoy, U-39, to intern herself at Cartagena, Spain. Originally, the gunboat claimed that her depth charges had caused the damage, but that conclusion seems unlikely. German reports of the action make no mention of a depth charge attack and attribute all the damage to an attack by two British planes which occurred the following day.

Wheeling spent the month of June at Gibraltar undergoing repairs. On Independence Day 1918, she stood out of the harbor in the escort of a Bizerte-bound convoy which arrived safely on the 9th. She arrived back at Gibraltar with a return convoy on 14 July. Six days later, the gunboat started out on another escort mission which she completed uneventfully at Bizerte on the 24th. On the return voyage, her convoy once more ran afoul of UB-50 when the U-boat sank SS Magellan early in the evening of the 25th.

=== End-of-war operations ===
Compared to the events of May and July, the remainder of her wartime service proved tame and routine. On 5 August, she left Gibraltar with 21 merchantmen and three other escorts for Genoa. Six days later, the group arrived in port; and, on 12 August, she put to sea with 12 steamers bound for Gibraltar.

She made three voyages to Genoa during August, September, and October, followed by a final voyage to Bizerte before the war ended. Wheeling was in Gibraltar on 11 November when the armistice was signed; and, 19 days later, she left that port and headed for Lisbon, Portugal, where she anchored on 2 December.

== Interwar Service ==
Leaving Lisbon the following day, Wheeling returned to Gibraltar on 5 December and, two days later, sailed for the United States. She stopped at Ponta Delgada, Azores, between 12 and 17 December and spent the night of 27 and 28 December coaling at St. George in the British West Indies. Operating once again in the Caribbean Sea, Wheeling received orders in mid-1919 to proceed to New Orleans, Louisiana, where she was decommissioned on 18 October 1919.

On 31 December of the same year, she was assigned to the 8th Naval District for the training of naval reservists. Wheeling received the designation PG-14 on 17 July 1920; and, on the 17th, she was commissioned in the reserve fleet. Her classification was changed on 1 July 1921 to IX-28; and, on 21 January 1923, she received orders to the 3d Naval District to be used as the training vessel for the 6th Naval Reserve Battalion. Wheeling reached her new home port, New York City, on 14 July 1923 and remained there until after World War II.

== World War II service ==
The warship was assigned to the Secretary of the Navy on 17 February 1941 for disposition, and the Navy solicited bids on her scrapping. However, on 28 December 1942, the order allowing her disposition was temporarily suspended, and the ship was ordered to be used as a berthing barge for motor torpedo boat crews manning newly built PT's in the New York area.

== Final decommissioning ==
On 13 February 1946, Wheeling was placed out of service; and on 8 March, she was declared ready for sale. Her name was struck from the Navy list on 28 March 1946; and, on 5 October 1946, she was sold for scrap
