= Daniel J. Callaghan =

United States Navy admiral (1890-1942)

Daniel Judson Callaghan
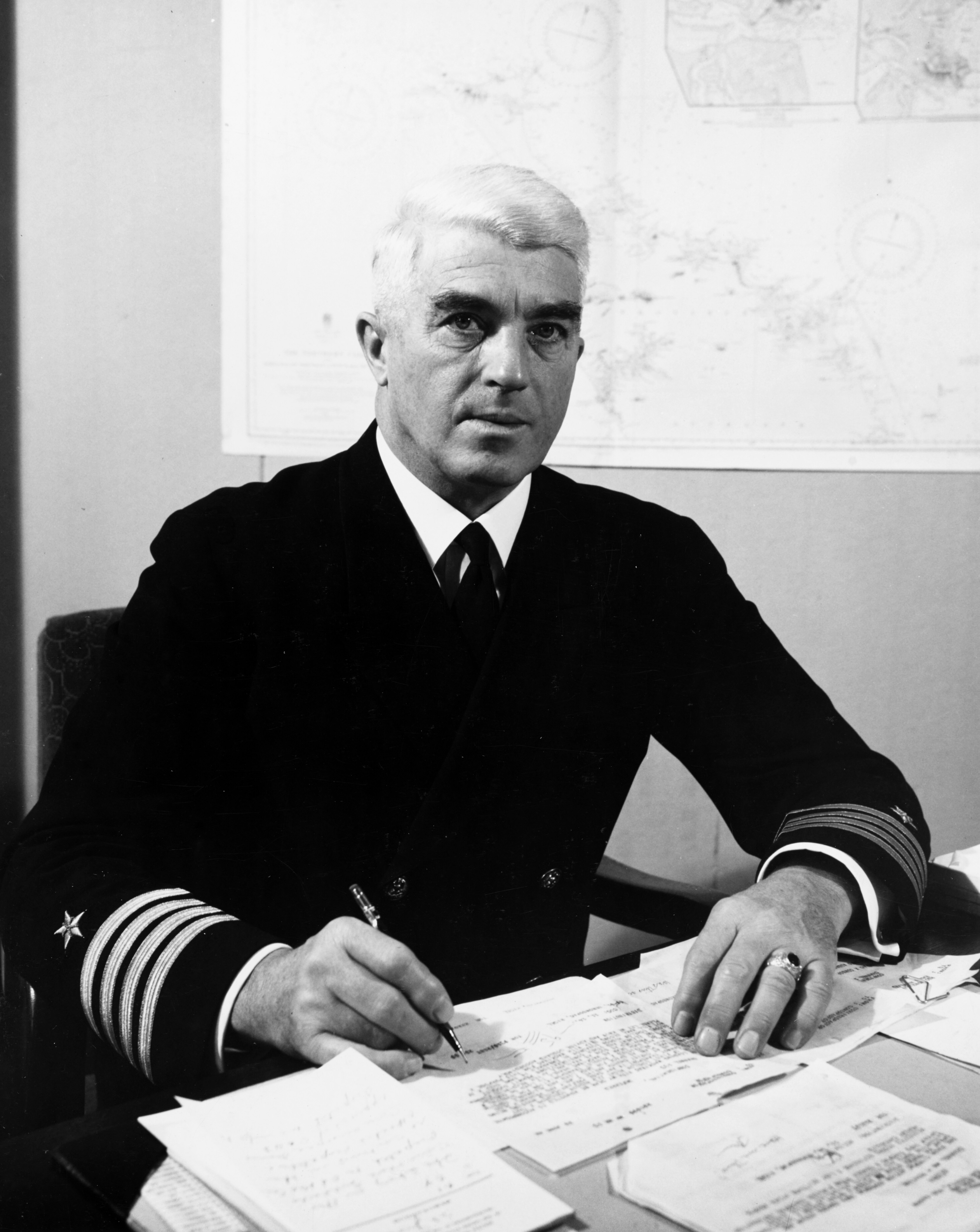
- Callaghan at South Pacific Headquarters, 1942
- Born: July 26, 1890; San Francisco, California, U.S.
- Died: November 13, 1942 (aged 52); Off Guadalcanal, British Solomon Islands
- Burial place: Buried at sea in Ironbottom Sound off Guadalcanal, British Solomon Islands
- Relatives: William Callaghan (brother)
- Military career
- Allegiance: United States
- Branch: United States Navy
- Service years: 1911–1942
- Rank: Rear admiral
- Units: Task Force 67
- Commands: USS Truxtun; USS San Francisco; Task Group 67.4
- Conflicts: World War I; World War II; Pacific War; Guadalcanal campaign; Naval Battle of Guadalcanal †
- Awards: Medal of Honor (posthumous); Distinguished Service Medal; Purple Heart

Daniel Judson Callaghan (July 26, 1890 – November 13, 1942) was a United States Navy officer who served his country in two wars, in a three-decades-long career. Callaghan served on several ships during his first 20 years of service, including escort duties during World War I, and also filled some shore-based administrative roles. He later came to the attention of President Franklin D. Roosevelt, who appointed Callaghan as his naval aide in 1938.

A few years later, he returned to command duties during the early stages of World War II. At the Naval Battle of Guadalcanal, during a surface action against a larger Japanese force off Savo Island, an enemy shell killed Callaghan on the bridge of his flagship, USS San Francisco. Callaghan received the Medal of Honor posthumously for his actions. He was the third of five US Navy admirals killed in battle during WWII, including: Isaac C. Kidd (1941, Attack on Pearl Harbor); Norman Scott (earlier on same night, in same battle, as Callaghan); Henry M. Mullinnix (1943, Battle of Makin); and Theodore E. Chandler (1945, invasion of Lingayen Gulf).

== Early life ==
Callaghan was born on July 26, 1890, in San Francisco, California, the son of businessman Charles William Callaghan and Rose Wheeler Callaghan. The family was devoutly Roman Catholic. Callaghan was named Daniel after his grandfather, who emigrated from County Cork, Ireland during the 1840s. One of his younger brothers, William Callaghan (1897–1991), would later go on to a career in the US Navy as well. Both brothers studied at Saint Ignatius College Preparatory in San Francisco, the elder graduating in the class of 1907. He then graduated from the United States Naval Academy in 1911. His first assignment was on board the armored cruiser USS California, in command of a turret with twin 8-inch (203 mm) guns. He was promoted to the rank of ensign on May 21, 1912.

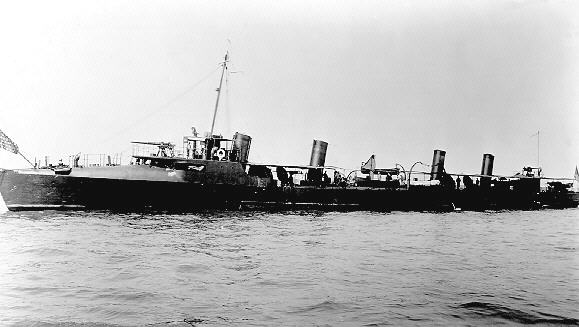
USS Truxtun was Callaghan's second posting, and later became his first command

His second assignment was on the destroyer USS Truxtun in mid-1913. He was promoted to lieutenant (junior grade) in May 1915. In his first few years of service, he developed a reputation as a conscientious sailor, noted for avoiding heavy alcohol consumption and regularly attending Mass. His dedication to naval gunnery also became apparent. Some years later, one of his captains, Joel Pringle, would write: "[Callaghan's] devotion to duty, sound judgment and ability to inspire loyalty in his subordinates have resulted in a constant and steady increase in the efficiency of the above mentioned batteries. At the recent battle practice of the Pacific Fleet in 5-inch guns, he made the largest percentage of hits of any ship of the Fleet."

During his first few years of naval service, Callaghan had been courting Mary Tormey of Oakland, California; the two married on July 23, 1914. Their son, Daniel Judson Callaghan Jr., was born in Alameda, California, on October 16, 1915.

In July 1915, Truxtun was on its way to Alaska when it broke down and could not continue its mission. Initially, the blame fell on Callaghan, who had apparently ordered incorrect condenser parts. He was suspended from duty and ordered to appear before a court-martial. Subsequent investigation, however, found that another man was responsible for the error, and Callaghan received a full acquittal and was reinstated. A few months later, he was appointed as commanding officer of Truxtun, but the stress of his trial appeared to have left its mark—at the age of 25 years, his hair had already turned gray.

== World War I ==
Callaghan's next posting was to the cruiser USS New Orleans in November 1916. Following the entry of the United States into World War I, in April 1917, New Orleans escorted cargo ships crossing the Atlantic Ocean. At this time, he first met Ross McIntire, a surgeon, who would later have a significant impact on his career. According to biographer Francis Murphy, Callaghan played a pivotal role in the rescue of a disabled British ocean liner off the coast of Ireland: "Four times a hawser was hauled aboard the cruiser from the liner, that was about three times the cruiser's size, and four times the cable parted. The Captain was for abandoning the job. But not Dan. With superhuman strength and the full cooperation of his men, he finally secured the cable. For forty-eight hours the New Orleans stayed with the stricken vessel hauling it out of danger [and] finally handing it on to tugs from a North Ireland base."

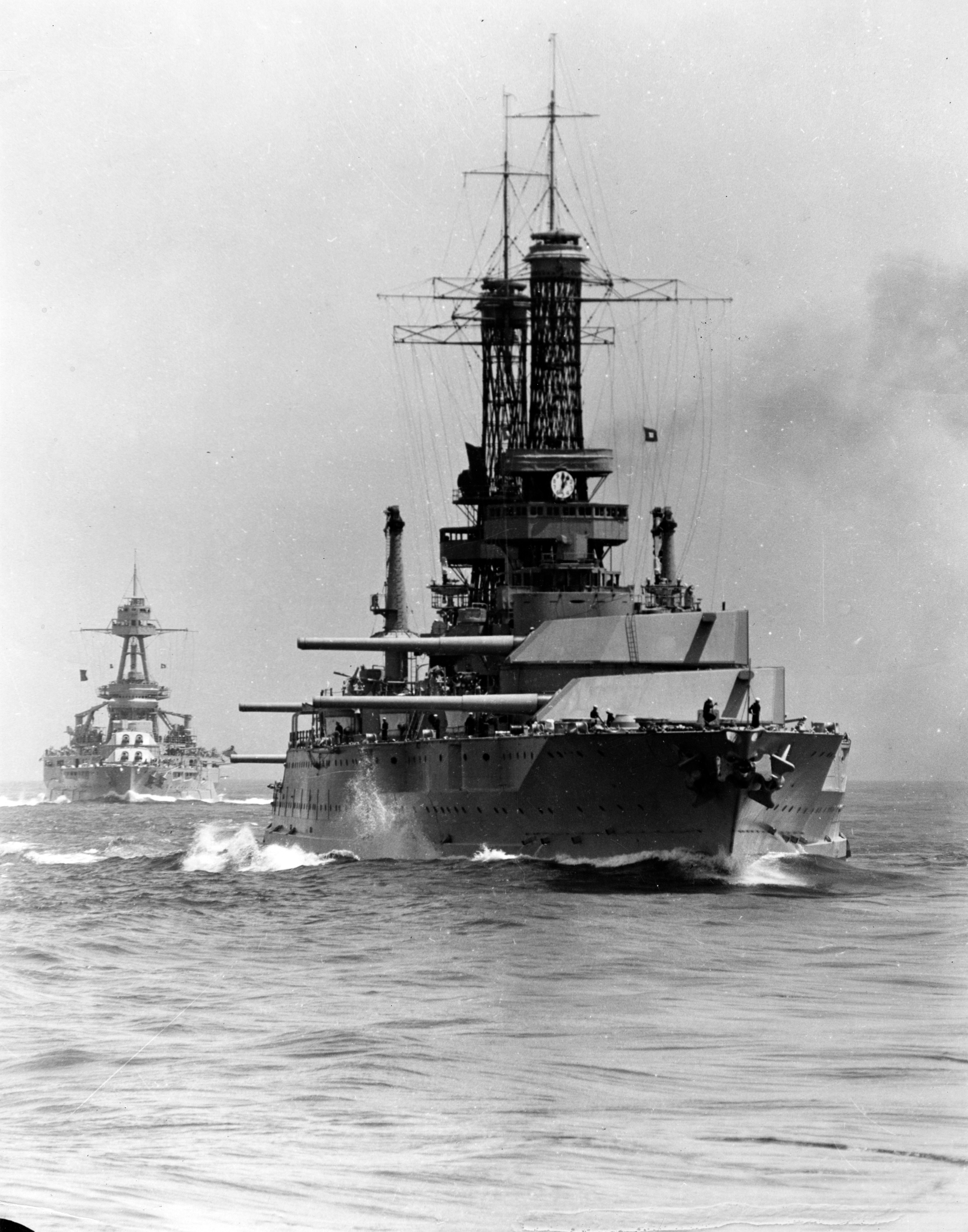
USS Idaho during battle practice around 1930

Following the war, he settled in Georgetown, Washington, D.C. for two years with his wife and young son. During this time, he worked on the reassignment of warrant and chief petty officers from the navy. Callaghan next served aboard the newly commissioned battleship USS Idaho, commencing in October 1920. While his family moved back to Oakland, he began serving as a fire control officer on Idaho. He left Idaho in June 1923, returning to shore duties for two years before taking up the position of first lieutenant on the battleship USS Colorado in May 1925. Colorado transported a shipment of gold to Australia before returning to the United States in 1926. His next assignment was the position of gunnery officer on board the battleship USS Mississippi. Captain Thomas Hart wrote of Callaghan: "I can scarcely report too favorably on this officer. He is excellent generally and particularly; and he looks and acts the part. As gunnery officer, he is being highly successful and I unhesitatingly recommend him for almost any detail."

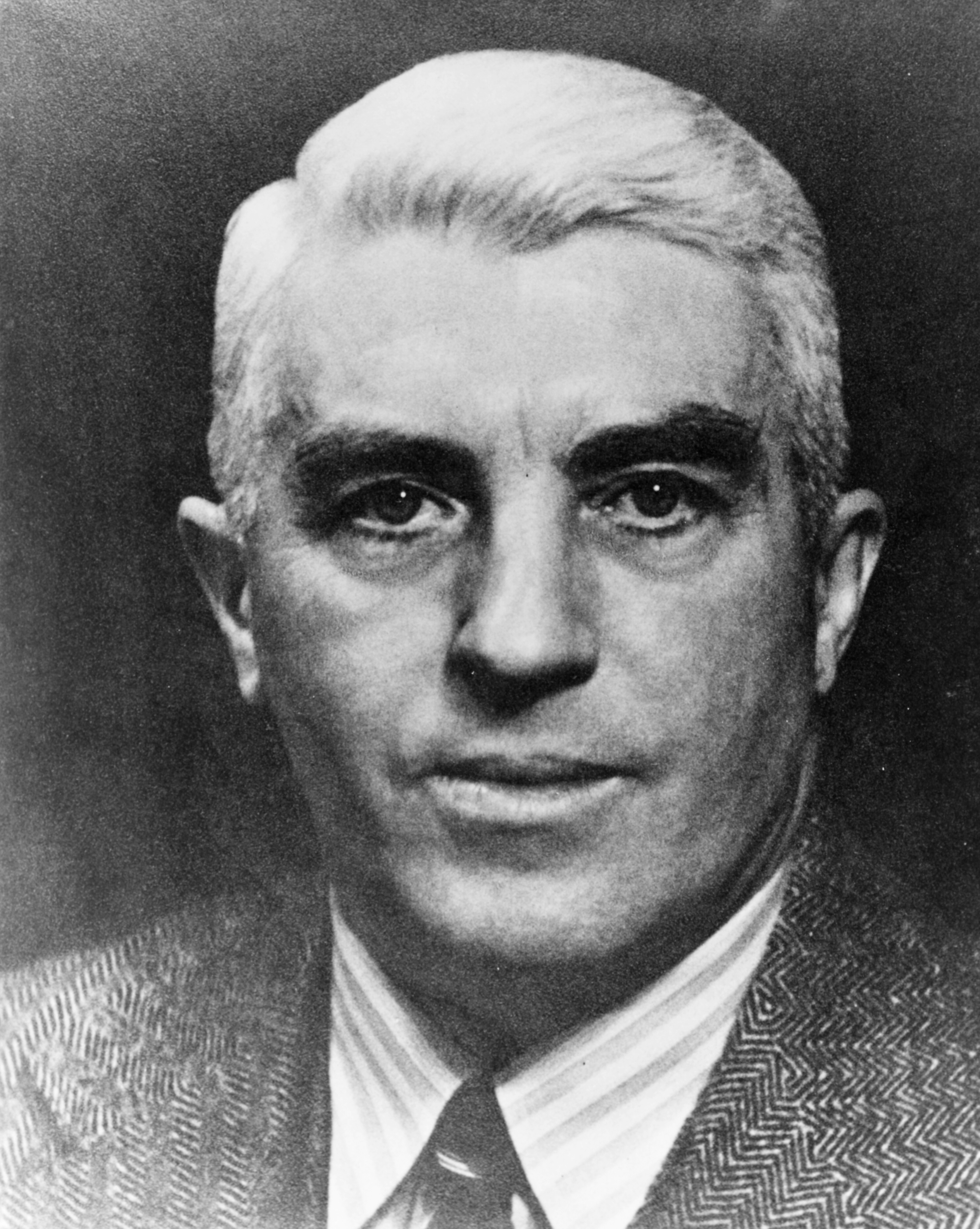
Callaghan as naval aide to President Franklin D. Roosevelt, 1940

Callaghan left Mississippi in July 1928 and worked in naval inspections for the next two years. He served as aide to the commander in chief, US Fleet, and was promoted to the rank of commander in June 1931. He then served as executive officer of the Naval Reserve Officer Training Corps at the University of California, Berkeley, before working on the cruiser USS Portland. In 1938, President Franklin D. Roosevelt asked his physician, Ross McIntire, to recommend someone for the position of naval aide. McIntire recommended Callaghan, who was appointed to the role in July 1938 and would fill it for the next three years. He was promoted to the rank of captain in October 1938.

== World War II ==
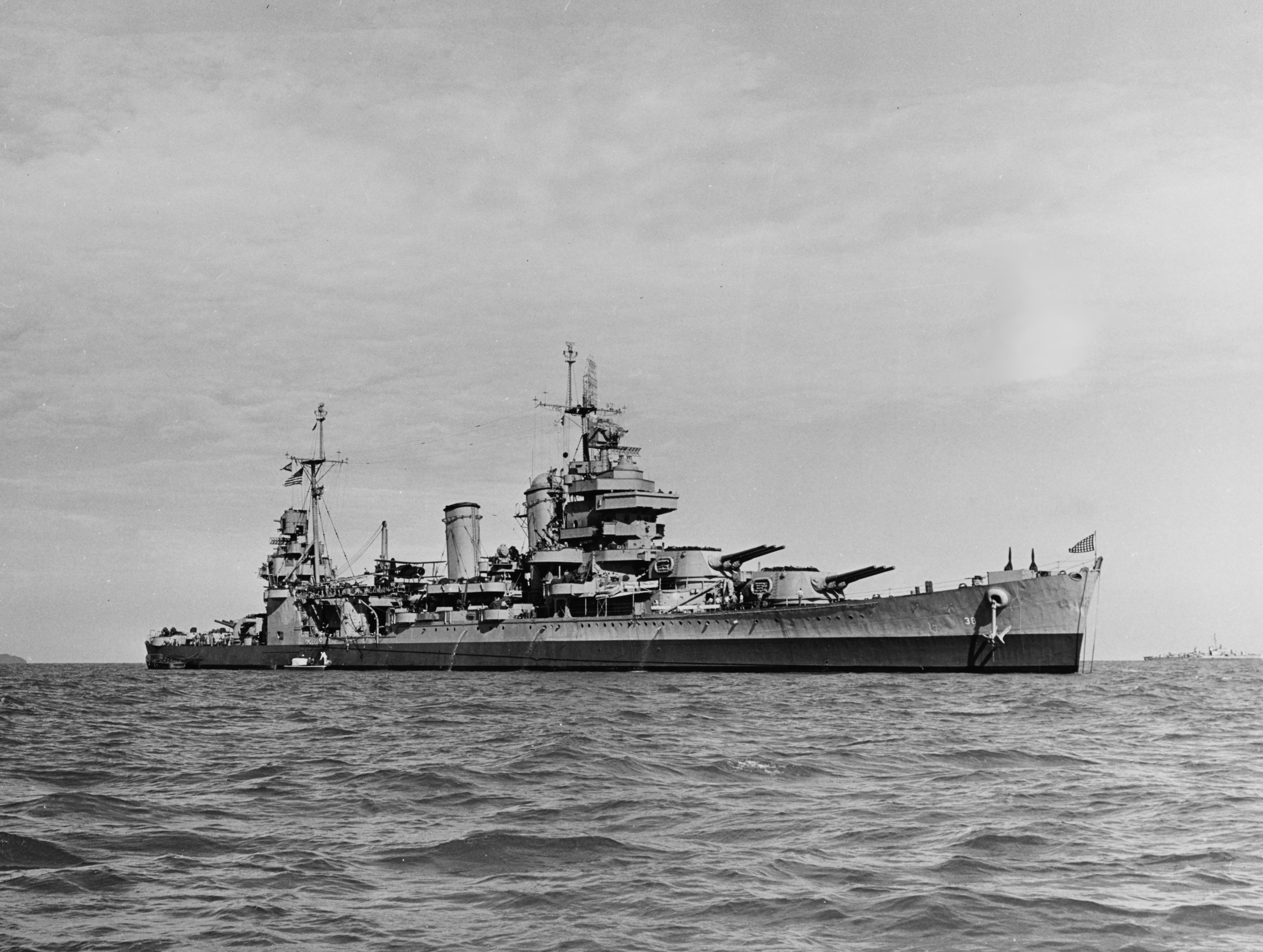
USS San Francisco off the Korean coast in 1945

In May 1941, during the early stages of World War II, Roosevelt released Callaghan to take command of the cruiser USS San Francisco. Roosevelt wrote: "It is with great regret that I am letting Captain Callaghan leave as my Naval Aide. He has given every satisfaction and has performed duties of many varieties with tact and real efficiency. He has shown a real understanding of the many problems of the service within itself and in relationship to the rest of Government."

In April 1942, he was promoted to the rank of rear admiral and was appointed as chief of staff to the commander, South Pacific Area and South Pacific Force Vice Admiral Robert L. Ghormley. He served in that billet until Vice Admiral Ghormley was relieved on 18 October 1942.

=== Naval Battle of Guadalcanal ===
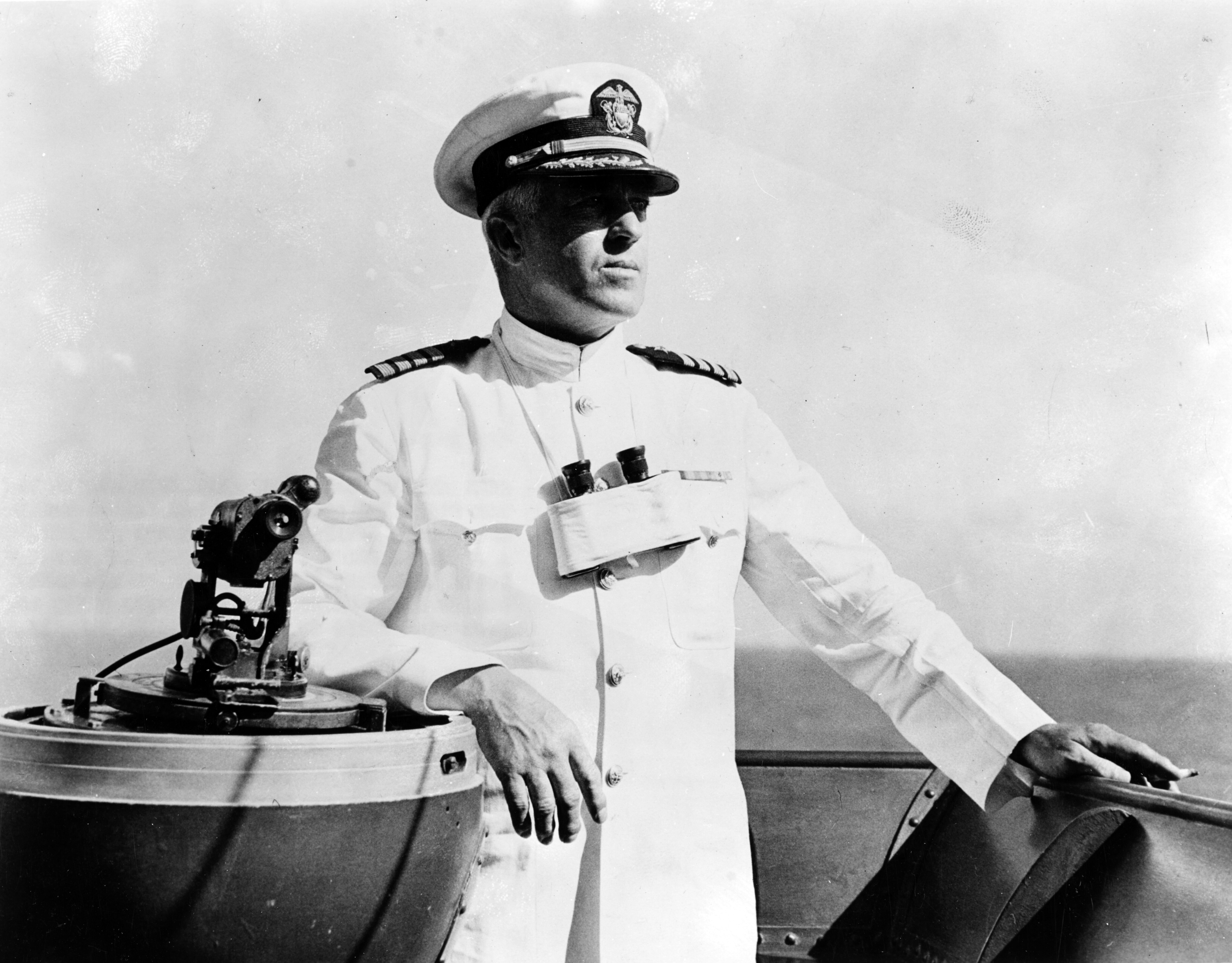
Callaghan on the bridge of the USS San Francisco c. 1941–1942

As commander of Task Group 67.4, he commanded U.S. naval forces against Japanese warships during the First Naval Battle of Guadalcanal on 13 November 1942. He was on the bridge of the USS San Francisco when enemy fire killed him and most of his command staff. At that time, he became the third US Navy admiral killed in action during World War II.^{[a]}

Following his death, Lieutenant Commander Bruce McCandless assumed operational command of San Francisco.^{[b]} Earlier in the battle, Rear Admiral Norman Scott had been killed, so two US commanders had now been lost, as well as several of their staff. Despite the deaths of so many senior officers, the battle ended in a strategic victory for the Allied side.

In hindsight, Callaghan was criticized for not distributing his five ships that had the superior SG radar systems throughout his battle line, for not using one of them as his flagship, for directing the battle from his flagship's bridge instead of the radar plot, for not issuing his battle plans to his captains, and for giving confusing orders during the battle. Analysis of the battle led to a rapid improvement in USN techniques for fighting in poor visibility, particularly in adopting combat information centers.

Callaghan was buried at sea. He was survived by his wife, Mary Tormey Callaghan, and son, Daniel Judson Callaghan Jr. (1915–2006). By order of President Roosevelt, both Rear Admirals Callaghan and Scott were posthumously awarded the Medal of Honor. His brother William Callaghan would later become the first captain of the battleship USS Missouri, a vice admiral, and the first commander of the Military Sea Transportation Service.

== Honors and awards ==
His decorations include: Before receiving the Medal of Honor, Callaghan had been awarded the Distinguished Service Medal. Other awards to Admiral Callaghan include the World War I Victory Medal, the American Defense Service Medal and posthumous awards of the Purple Heart, Asiatic-Pacific Campaign Medal and World War II Victory Medal.

=== Medal of Honor ===
Callaghan's Medal of Honor citation read:

For extraordinary heroism and conspicuous intrepidity above and beyond the call of duty during action against enemy Japanese forces off Savo Island on the night of 12–13 November 1942. Although out-balanced in strength and numbers by a desperate and determined enemy, Rear Admiral Callaghan, with ingenious tactical skill and superb coordination of the units under his command, led his forces into battle against tremendous odds, thereby contributing decisively to the rout of a powerful invasion fleet and to the consequent frustration of a formidable Japanese offensive. While faithfully directing close-range operations in the face of furious bombardment by superior enemy fire power, he was killed on the bridge of his Flagship. His courageous initiative, inspiring leadership, and judicious foresight in a crisis of grave responsibility were in keeping with the finest traditions of the United States Naval Service. He gallantly gave his life in the defense of his country.

His son was a lieutenant (junior grade) at the time and accepted his father's Medal of Honor on his behalf.

== Legacy ==
The US Navy has named two ships after Callaghan: USS Callaghan (DD-792) and USS Callaghan (DDG-994). The first ship was commissioned on November 27, 1943, and was sponsored by Callaghan's widow. It sank in late July 1945 in a kamikaze attack.^{[c]} The second ship was commissioned on August 29, 1981, one of a class named for the four American admirals killed in World War II, and sold to Taiwan just over 20 years later.

Callaghan Hall at Officer Training Command, Newport, Rhode Island, is named in his honor. The Callaghan Fitness Center at Norfolk Naval Shipyard in Portsmouth Virginia is also named for him. A street, Admiral Callaghan Lane in Vallejo, California, is also named after him, and a monument in Lands End, San Francisco (including part of the bridge of USS San Francisco, where he died), honors him and his comrades. Callaghan's name is listed on Tablets of the Missing at Manila American Cemetery in the Philippines.

Callaghan's high school alma mater, Saint Ignatius, created the "Admiral Daniel J. Callaghan Society" to honor his legacy, as well as the legacy of other graduates who entered military service.

== See also ==
- List of Medal of Honor recipients for World War II
- New Orleans-class cruiser
- Truxtun-class destroyer

== Notes ==
a. The first two US Navy admirals killed in action during World War II were fellow Rear Admirals Norman Scott, earlier in the same engagement, and Isaac Kidd, killed on the bridge of USS Arizona at Pearl Harbor.

b. While this would normally have been grave misconduct, McCandless reportedly did so because: (1) he was intimately familiar with the plan of attack and was afraid that there would be mistakes if command passed on to another ship, and (2) he wanted to prevent news of Callaghan's death reaching the enemy (through radio interception). McCandless received the Medal of Honor for his action.

c. The Dictionary of American Naval Fighting Ships gives July 28 as the date USS Callaghan (DD-792) sank, while Barry Foster gives July 29 as the date of sinking.
