= USS Perry (DD-11) =

Bainbridge-class destroyer

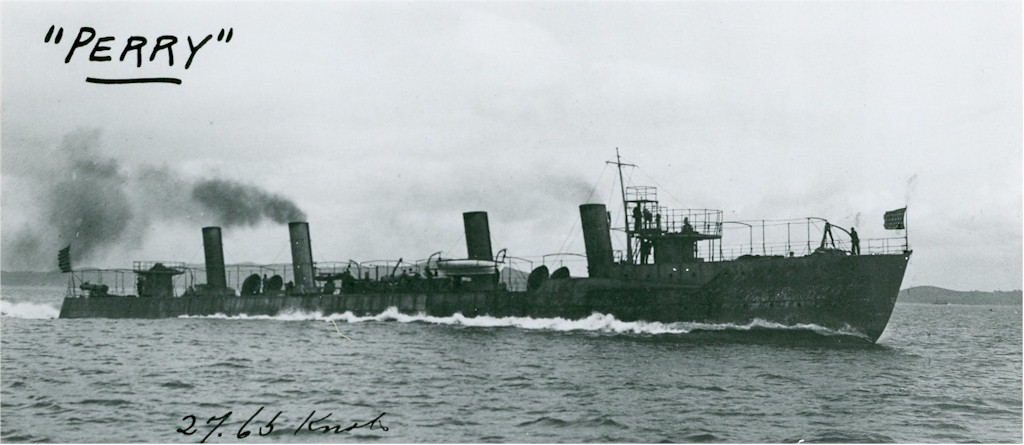
- USS Perry, 27.65 knots on speed trials in San Francisco Bay April 30, 1902.

History

United States
- Name: Perry
- Namesake: Commodore Oliver Hazard Perry awarded Congressional Gold Medal
- Builder: Union Iron Works, San Francisco
- Laid down: 19 April 1899
- Launched: 27 October 1900
- Commissioned: 4 September 1902
- Decommissioned: 2 July 1919
- Stricken: 15 September 1919
- Fate: Sold, 3 January 1920 and broken up for scrap

General characteristics
- Class & type: Bainbridge-class destroyer
- Displacement: 420 long tons (430 t) (standard); 592 long tons (601 t) (full load)
- Length: 245 ft (74.7 m) (pp); 250 ft (76.2 m) (oa)
- Beam: 23 ft 7 in (7.2 m)
- Draft: 6 ft 6 in (2 m) (mean)
- Installed power: 4 × Thornycroft boilers; 8,000 ihp (6,000 kW)
- Propulsion: 2 × Vertical triple expansion engines; 2 × Propellers
- Speed: 29 kn (54 km/h; 33 mph) (designed speed)
- Complement: 3 officers; 72 enlisted men
- Armament: 2 × 3 in (76 mm)/50 caliber guns; 5 × 6-pounder (57 mm (2.2 in)) guns; 2 × 18 in (457 mm) torpedo tubes

The second USS Perry was a Bainbridge-class destroyer in the United States Navy. She was named for Commodore Oliver Hazard Perry.

== Construction ==
Perry was laid down on 19 April 1899, by Union Iron Works, San Francisco, California; launched on 27 October 1900; sponsored by Miss Maude O'Connor; and commissioned on 4 September 1902.

== Pre-World War I ==
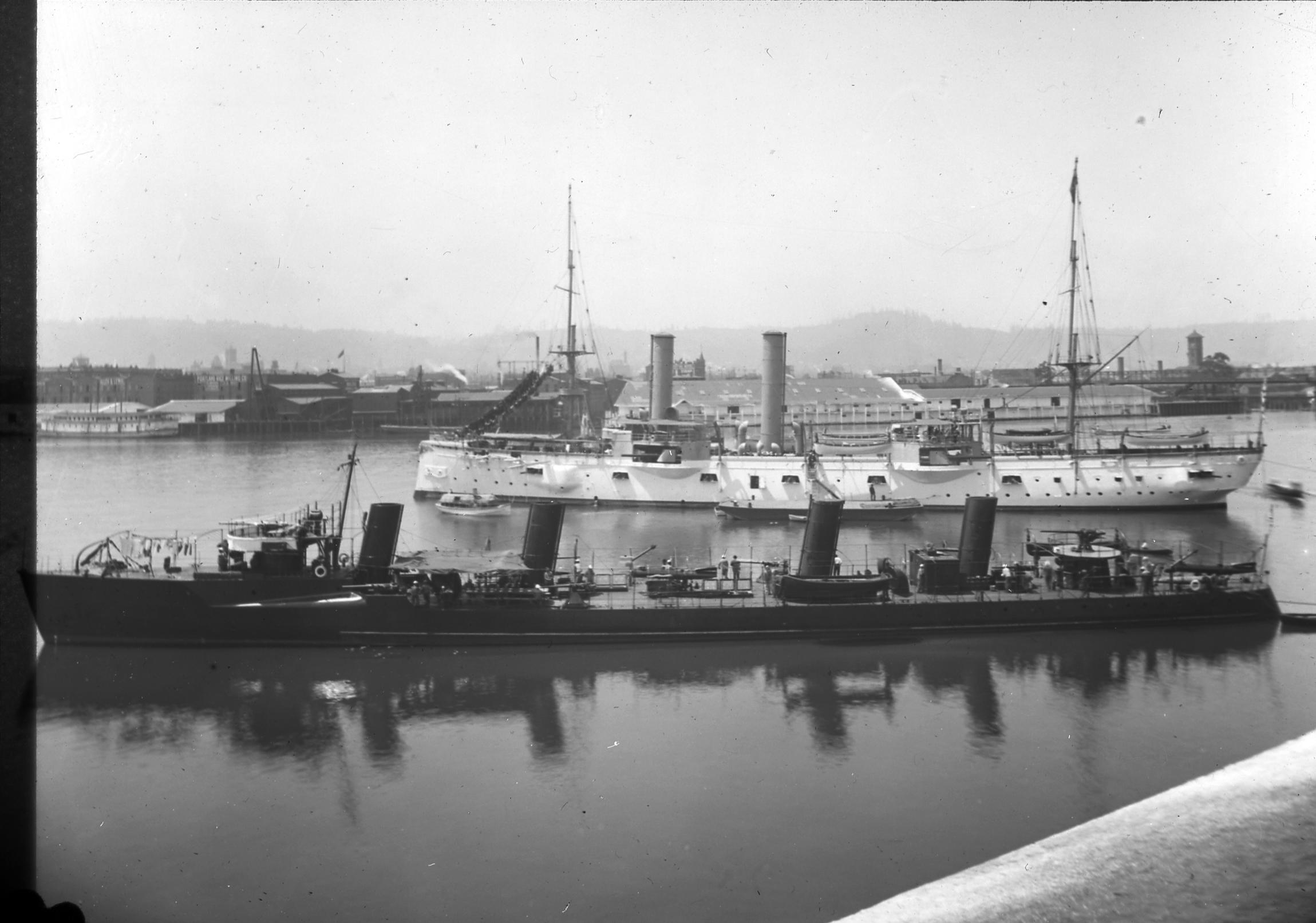
USS Perry and USS Chicago in Portland during the Lewis and Clark Exposition, June 1905

Perry was assigned to the Pacific Torpedo Flotilla and based at Mare Island until the United States entered World War I. Her operations took her as far north as Alaska and south along the coast of Mexico; and in the fall of 1908, combined fleet maneuvers took her to Hawaii.

Perhaps the highlight of the torpedo boat destroyer's career came during the earthquake which struck San Francisco on 18 April 1906, and the resulting fire which devastated the city. For four days after, they were awakened by severe rolling and pitching of their ship before dawn on 18 April, the crew labored to save the western metropolis by fighting fires; patrolling districts where stores, warehouses, and homes were threatened by looters; and providing medical aid to countless injured men, women, and children.

In 1914, Perry observed the Topolobampo naval campaign in the Gulf of California during the Mexican Revolution, she was present at the Fourth Battle of Topolobampo, the final naval action of the campaign.

== World War I ==
When the United States entered World War I, Perry patrolled off the California Coast until steaming to Panama where, beginning on 28 July 1917, she guarded the entrance to the vital canal. On 30 May 1918, she sailed for Key West for patrol duty in the Florida Keys. After the Armistice, she got under way for the Delaware Bay on 29 January 1919, and remained at the Philadelphia Navy Yard until decommissioning on 2 July. Perry's name was struck from the Naval Vessel Register on 15 September, and she was sold to Henry A. Hitner's Sons Company for scrapping on 5 January 1920.

== Noteworthy commanding officers ==
- Lieutenant commander Frank Herman Schofield (25 June 1904 – 1 November 1905) (Later Rear Admiral)
- Lieutenant Edgar Brown Larimer (11 July 1907 – 13 October 1909) (Later Rear admiral and Chief of the Bureau of Ordnance (1931-1934))
- Lieutenant JG Harry Adrian McClure (11 September 1915 – 3 April 1916) (Later Commodore)
