= Bainbridge class =

Bainbridge class may refer to:

- Bainbridge-class destroyer, US Navy, built from 1899 through 1903
- Bainbridge-class cruiser, US Navy, built from 1959 through 1961
