= Edward Alvin Clary =

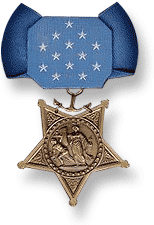
- Born: May 6, 1883; Foxport, Kentucky
- Died: April 30, 1939 (aged 55); Santa Fe, New Mexico
- Burial place: Santa Fe National Cemetery
- Military career
- Allegiance: United States of America
- Branch: United States Navy
- Rank: Chief Watertender
- Unit: USS Hopkins (DD-6)
- Awards: Medal of Honor

Edward Alvin Clary (May 6, 1883 – April 30, 1939) was a United States Navy sailor and a recipient of the United States military's highest decoration, the Medal of Honor.

== Biography ==
A native of Foxport, Fleming County, Kentucky, Clary joined the Navy from that state. By February 14, 1910, he was serving as a watertender on the USS Hopkins (DD-6). On that day, the Hopkins experienced a boiler accident. For his actions during the incident, Bonney was awarded the Medal of Honor a month later, on March 23, 1910. Another sailor, Chief Watertender Robert Earl Bonney, received the medal for the same incident.

Clary's official Medal of Honor citation reads:

On board the U.S.S. Hopkins for extraordinary heroism in the line of his profession on the occasion of the accident to one of the boilers of that vessel, 14 February 1910.

Clary reached the rank of chief watertender before leaving the Navy after a 30-year career. He later worked as a prohibition agent and lived in Santa Fe, New Mexico. At age 55, he died at his home in Santa Fe of coronary thrombosis; he was buried in Santa Fe National Cemetery.

== See also ==
- List of Medal of Honor recipients in non-combat incidents
