= USS Macdonough (DD-9) =

Lawrence-class destroyer

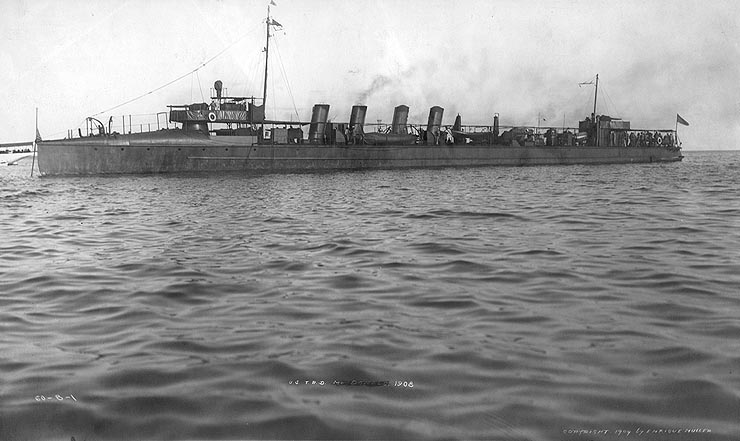
- USS Macdonough (DD-9) at anchor in 1908.

History

United States
- Name: Macdonough
- Namesake: Commodore (United States) Thomas Macdonough awarded Congressional Gold Medal
- Builder: Fore River Ship & Engine Company, Weymouth, Massachusetts
- Laid down: 21 April 1899
- Launched: 24 December 1900
- Sponsored by: Miss Lucy Shaler Macdonough, granddaughter of Commodore Thomas Macdonough
- Commissioned: 5 September 1903
- Decommissioned: 3 September 1919
- Stricken: 7 November 1919
- Identification: Hull symbol: DD-7; Code letters: NJH
- Fate: Sold, 10 March 1920

General characteristics
- Class & type: Lawrence-class destroyer sub-class of Bainbridge-class destroyer
- Displacement: 400 long tons (410 t) (standard)
- Length: 246 ft 3 in (75.06 m) (oa)
- Beam: 22 ft 3 in (6.78 m)
- Draft: 9 ft 5 in (2.87 m)
- Installed power: 8,400 shp (6,300 kW)
- Propulsion: 2 × Vertical triple expansion engines; 2 × shaft
- Speed: 30 kn (35 mph; 56 km/h)
- Capacity: 108 short tons (98 t) coal
- Complement: 73 officers and enlisted
- Armament: 2 × 3 in (76 mm)/50 caliber guns (removed in 1906 after trials found them to be too heavy for ship); 5 × 6-pounder 57 mm (2.2 in) guns (added 2 more in 1906 when 3" guns were removed); 2 × 18 in (460 mm) torpedo tubes

The first USS Macdonough (DD-9) was a Lawrence-class destroyer, which was a sub-class of Bainbridge-class destroyer, in the United States Navy. She was named for Commodore Thomas Macdonough

== Construction ==
Macdonough was laid down on 10 April 1899, by the Fore River Ship & Engine Company, Weymouth, Massachusetts; launched on 24 December 1900; sponsored by Miss Lucy Shaler Macdonough, granddaughter of Commodore Macdonough; and commissioned on 5 September 1903.

== Pre-World War I ==
Macdonough failed to make the design speed of 30 knots (56 km/h; 35 mph) during trials, and along with her fellow Fore River-built destroyer Lawrence proved to have poor sea keeping. Both ships had their two 3-inch guns replaced by six-pounder guns, giving a gun armament of seven six-pounders.

After shakedown, Macdonough spent seven months as a training ship for midshipmen at the United States Naval Academy, Annapolis, Maryland. On 31 May 1904, she joined the Coast Squadron, North Atlantic Fleet and for the next three years operated along the east coast and in the Caribbean. She was ordered to the Reserve Torpedo Fleet at Norfolk on 16 May 1907 and served with that fleet until the following year.

Placed in full commission on 21 November 1908, Macdonough became the flagship of the 3rd Torpedo Flotilla and sailed for Pensacola, Florida. She participated in operations out of that port until the following spring when she returned to the east coast. During the summer of 1909, she cruised with the Atlantic Torpedo Squadron off New England. She then returned to the Gulf of Mexico and steamed up the Mississippi River for the St. Louis Centennial Celebration. Returning to the east coast in December, she was placed in reserve at Charleston, South Carolina on the 16th. Macdonough took part in summer exercises during the summer of 1910 and returned to Charleston, where, with the exception of two cruises to New York, she remained for the next two years. In 1913 and 1914, she conducted summer cruises for the Massachusetts Naval Militia.

== World War I ==
On 29 January 1915, Macdonough was detached from the Reserve Torpedo Flotilla and assigned to the Submarine Flotilla, Atlantic Fleet. For the next two years, she operated with submarines in maneuvers and exercises from Pensacola to Newport, Rhode Island. Following this duty, she commenced, on 27 March 1917, a recruiting cruise along the Mississippi River. In mid-June the ship departed New Orleans, Louisiana for Charleston where she joined the Destroyer Force, Atlantic Fleet. Until January 1918, she performed screening assignments off the east coast. On 16 January 1918, she departed Philadelphia for Brest, France, arriving 20 February. She remained off the coast of France, providing escort and patrol services until 20 May 1919. Sailing for the United States, she arrived at Philadelphia on 24 June and remained in that port until decommissioned on 3 September. Her name was struck from the Naval Vessel Register on 7 November 1919 and her hulk was sold to Henry A. Hitner's Sons Company for scrapping on 10 March 1920.

== Noteworthy commanding officers ==
- Lieutenant Julius Frederick Hellweg (14 September 1906 – 16 May 1907) (Later Rear Admiral)
- Lieutenant Charles Adams Blakely (14 October 1912 – 1 December 1912) (Later Vice admiral)

== Bibliography ==
- Chesneau, Roger; Kolesnik, Eugene M (1979). Conway's All the World's Fighting Ships 1860–1905. London: Conway Maritime Press. ISBN 0-85177-133-5.
- Eger, Christopher L. (March 2021). "Hudson Fulton Celebration, Part II". Warship International. LVIII (1): 58–81. ISSN 0043-0374.
- Captain Harvey S. Haislip, USN (Ret.). "A Memory of Ships". Proceedings. 103/9/895.
