= Robert Earl Bonney =

- Born: November 23, 1882; Maryville, Tennessee
- Died: November 22, 1967 (aged 84)
- Burial place: Acacia Memorial Park, Seattle, Washington
- Military career
- Allegiance: United States
- Branch: United States Navy
- Service years: 1901 - 1930; 194? - 1945
- Rank: Lieutenant
- Unit: USS Hopkins (DD-6)
- Awards: Medal of Honor

Robert Earl Bonney (November 23, 1882 – November 22, 1967) was a United States Navy sailor and a recipient of the United States military's highest decoration, the Medal of Honor.

== Biography ==
=== Early life and career ===
Bonney was born in Maryville, Blount County, Tennessee on November 23, 1882.

In 1901, at the age of 18, he joined the Navy in Leavenworth, Kansas. His early career included service in the Philippines during the Philippine Insurrection.

=== Medal of Honor action ===
By February 14, 1910, he was serving as a chief watertender on the USS Hopkins (DD-6). On that day, the Hopkins experienced a boiler accident. For their actions during the incident, Bonney and another sailor, Watertender Edward Alvin Clary, were awarded the Medal of Honor.

Bonney's official Medal of Honor citation reads:

While serving on board the U.S.S. Hopkins, Bonney displayed extraordinary heroism in the line of his profession on the occasion of the accident to one of the boilers of that vessel, 14 February 1910.

=== Later career ===
Bonney's later career included service in Nicaragua in 1912, the Mexican intervention in 1914 and World War I. He retired from the Navy in 1930 the warrant officer rank of chief machinist.

Bonney returned to active duty during World War II and was promoted to lieutenant. He served as an inspector of shipyards in Seattle, Washington. He retired from the Navy for the second time shortly after the war's end in 1945.

=== Retirement ===
Bonney was an active in Freemasonry, the American Legion and the Fleet Reserve Association.

In 1957 he was invited to attend the second inauguration of President Dwight Eisenhower. In 1958, at Eisenhower's request, he laid a wreath at the Tomb of the Unknowns at Arlington National Cemetery. He also attended the funeral of President John F. Kennedy at the invitation of the Kennedy family.

He died on November 22, 1967.

== Awards ==
- Medal of Honor
- Philippine Campaign Medal
- Nicaraguan Campaign Medal
- Mexican Service Medal
- World War I Victory Medal
- American Campaign Medal
- World War II Victory Medal

== See also ==
- List of Medal of Honor recipients
