= USS Hull (DD-7) =

Hopkins-class destroyer

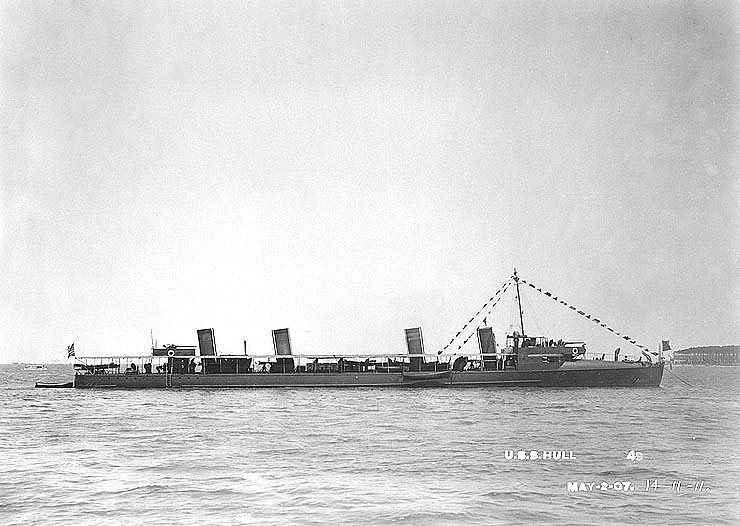
- USS Hull (DD-7) dressed with flags, while at anchor on 2 May 1907.

History

United States
- Name: Hull
- Namesake: Commodore Isaac Hull awarded Congressional Gold Medal
- Builder: Harlan and Hollingsworth, Wilmington, Delaware
- Laid down: 22 February 1899
- Launched: 21 June 1902
- Commissioned: 20 May 1903
- Decommissioned: 7 July 1919
- Stricken: 15 September 1919
- Fate: Sold, 3 January 1920

General characteristics
- Class & type: Hopkins-class destroyer sub-class of Bainbridge-class destroyer
- Displacement: 408 long tons (415 t) (standard)
- Length: 248 ft 8 in (75.79 m) (oa)
- Beam: 24 ft 6 in (7.47 m)
- Draft: 10 ft 6 in (3.20 m)
- Installed power: 7,200 shp (5,400 kW)
- Propulsion: 2 × Vertical triple expansion engines; 2 × shaft
- Speed: 29 kn (33 mph; 54 km/h)
- Complement: 73 officers and enlisted
- Armament: 2 × 3 in (76 mm)/50 caliber guns; 5 × 6-pounder 57 mm (2.2 in) guns; 2 × 18 in (460 mm) torpedo tubes

USS Hull (DD-7) was a Hopkins-class destroyer, which was a sub-class of the Bainbridge-class destroyer, in the United States Navy, the second ship named for Commodore Isaac Hull.

== Construction ==
Hull was launched by Harlan & Hollingsworth of Wilmington, Delaware, on 21 June 1902; sponsored by Miss Mabel Hull, a descendant of Commodore Hull; and commissioned on 20 May 1903, Lieutenant Samuel Robison in command.

== Pre-World War I ==
During her first two years of service, Hull engaged in patrol and training maneuvers off Newport and in Chesapeake Bay. After a cruise to the Caribbean January–April 1905, she returned to League Island, Pennsylvania, where she decommissioned on 30 September.

Hull recommissioned on 14 November 1906 at Philadelphia, and took part in winter exercises with fleet units in Cuban waters. After operations off Newport, the ship returned to Norfolk in October 1907 to prepare for the voyage of the "Great White Fleet". Hull sailed as an escort vessel on 2 December and after stopping at many South American and Central American ports on the voyage around South America with the great battleships, arrived San Diego on 28 April 1907. Hull was detached on the west coast, and the Great White Fleet continued on its cruise, showing the flag around the world. The destroyer remained in the vicinity of San Francisco until departing on 24 August 1908 for a cruise to the South Pacific. She took part in various exercises in Hawaiian and Samoan waters before returning to San Diego in November.

== World War I ==
Hull spent the years before World War I on patrol and training exercises off the California coast. She decommissioned on 30 October 1912 and joined the Reserve Torpedo Division at Mare Island, with which she made occasional training cruises to California ports. When America entered the war in April 1917, Hull was being refitted at Mare Island. She sailed with other destroyers for the Panama Canal Zone on 25 April and for the next three months was engaged in defensive patrol off the western approaches to that vital waterway. She sailed to Norfolk on 26 July for escort and patrol duty along the East Coast. In the months that followed, Hull escorted ships to Bermuda and engaged in training maneuvers with other ships of the fleet as well. In June 1918, she broke up an attack by German submarine U-151 on a merchant ship, and often rescued sailors from sinking ships. She continued this vital ocean patrol duty until the end of the war.

Hull arrived at Philadelphia on 29 January 1919, and decommissioned on 7 July. She was sold on 5 January 1921 to Henry A. Hitner's Sons Company of Philadelphia.

== Noteworthy commanding officers ==
- Lieutenant Samuel Robison (20 May 1903 – 23 June 1904) (Later Rear Admiral)
- Lieutenant Thomas C. Hart (14 November 1906 – 14 June 1907) (Later Admiral)
- Lieutenant commander Robert Stevenson Haggart (December 1917-7 July 1919) (Later Commodore)
