= USS Whipple (DD-15) =

Truxtun-class destroyer

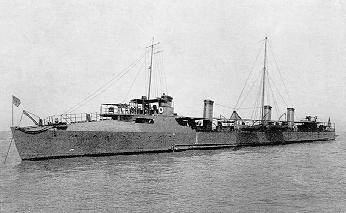
- USS Whipple (DD-15) at anchor during the early 1900s.

History

United States
- Name: Whipple
- Namesake: Commodore Abraham Whipple
- Builder: Maryland Steel Company Sparrows Point, Maryland
- Laid down: 13 November 1899
- Launched: 15 August 1901
- Sponsored by: Miss Elsie Pope
- Commissioned: 17 February 1903
- Decommissioned: 5 September 1905
- Recommissioned: 16 July 1906
- Decommissioned: 7 July 1919
- Stricken: 15 September 1919
- Identification: Hull symbol: DD-15
- Fate: Sold for merchant service, 3 January 1920; Scrapped 1956

General characteristics
- Class & type: Truxtun-class destroyer
- Displacement: 433 long tons (440 t) normal, 605 long tons (615 t) full load
- Length: 259 ft 6 in (79.10 m)
- Beam: 23 ft 3 in (7.09 m)
- Draft: 9 ft 10 in (3.00 m)
- Propulsion: 4 × boilers, 2 × Vertical expansion engines, 8,300 ihp (6,200 kW); 2 × screws
- Speed: 29.6 kn (34.1 mph; 54.8 km/h)
- Complement: 3 Officers; 75 Enlisted
- Armament: 2 × 3 in (76 mm)/50 caliber guns; 6 × 6-pounder 57 mm (2.2 in) guns; 2 × 18 inch (450 mm) torpedo tubes

The first USS Whipple (DD-15) was a Truxtun-class destroyer in the United States Navy, named for Abraham Whipple.

== Built in Sparrows Point, Maryland ==
She was laid down on 13 November 1899, at Sparrows Point, Maryland, by the Maryland Steel Company; launched on 15 August 1901; sponsored by Miss Elsie Pope; and commissioned on 17 February 1903, Lieutenant Jehu V. Chase in command.

== Pre-World War I ==
After training in Chesapeake Bay, Whipple was assigned to the 2nd Torpedo Flotilla, Atlantic Fleet, and was based at Norfolk. The destroyer periodically served as flagship of the flotilla and operated off the east coast and in the Caribbean until she was placed in reserve at Norfolk on 5 September 1905.

Returning to active service on 16 July 1906, the ship conducted tactical exercises and routine training operations through November 1907, apart from taking part in relief operations after the 1907 Kingston earthquake in Jamaica. On 2 December, Whipple stood out of Hampton Roads and headed south toward the Caribbean for goodwill visits — "showing the flag."

Subsequently, following in the wake of the 16 battleships of the "Great White Fleet", Whipple and her flotilla-mates called at Rio de Janeiro; rounded Cape Horn for ports on the Chilean and Peruvian coasts; and conducted target practice at Magdalena Bay, Mexico. After participating in a fleet review at San Francisco on 8 May 1908, Whipple remained on the west coast, based at San Diego, as a unit of the Pacific Torpedo Flotilla.

Departing San Francisco at the end of a towline on 24 August, the destroyer subsequently took part in fleet battle problems in Hawaiian waters. Upon completion of the exercises, she steamed back to the west coast via Samoa and Magdalena Bay, Baja California, before arriving at San Diego on 1 December.

For the next six years, the destroyer operated off the west coast between San Diego and Magdalena Bay and made one cruise to Alaskan waters for maneuvers. The ship received the Mexican Service Medal for service off the Mexican coast in 1914 and 1916. While that country suffered in the throes of revolution and civil strife, the destroyer conducted patrols and stood ready to protect American lives and property.

== World War I ==
On 6 April 1917, America entered World War I on the side of Britain, France, and Italy. Whipple soon commenced patrols off the approaches to the vital Panama Canal before departing the Panama Canal Zone on 5 July.

Refitted for "distant service", the destroyer put to sea on 28 August, bound for the Atlantic war zone, and put into the Azores on 17 September. Whipple operated on escort duties, convoying ships to and from the strategic islands for the next three months.

She then received orders to report at Brest, France. Anti-submarine patrols and convoy escort duties occupied Whipple through the early spring of 1918. On 17 April, munition ship Florence H. blew up off Quiberon Bay. Braving flying debris from the exploding ship, Whipple joined Stewart and Truxtun in rescuing 32 men of the 77-man crew of that doomed vessel.

Whipple carried out her routine wartime patrol duties through the end of hostilities. On 9 December, the destroyer departed the French coast and headed homeward, touching at the Azores and Bermuda before making port at Philadelphia on 3 January 1919.

The destroyer was decommissioned at the Philadelphia Navy Yard on 7 July, and her name was struck from the Naval Vessel Register on 15 September. On 3 January 1920, Henry A. Hitner's Sons Company, of Philadelphia, purchased the ship for scrapping.

== Noteworthy commanding officers ==
- Lieutenant Jehu V. Chase (17 February 1903 – 3 June 1905) (Later Rear admiral)
- Lieutenant Frank H. Brumby (8 August 1906 – 25 August 1906) (Later Admiral)
- Lieutenant Hutchinson I. Cone (8 October 1907 – 1 June 1908) (Later Rear admiral)

== Bibliography ==
- Sieche, Erwin F. (1990). "Austria-Hungary's Last Visit to the USA". Warship International. XXVII (2): 142–164. ISSN 0043-0374.
