= USS Lawrence (DD-8) =

Lawrence-class destroyer

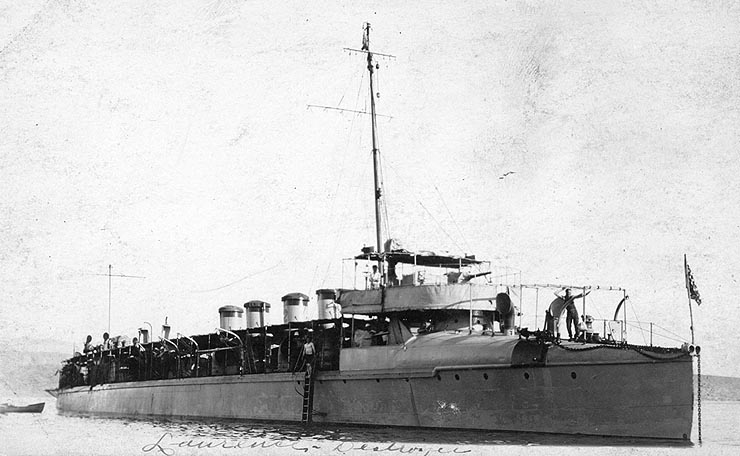
- USS Lawrence (DD-8) anchored in a Pacific Coast harbor, probably on 26 May 1916

History

United States
- Name: Lawrence
- Namesake: Captain James Lawrence awarded Congressional Gold Medal
- Builder: Fore River Ship & Engine Company, Quincy, Massachusetts
- Laid down: 10 April 1899
- Launched: 7 November 1900
- Sponsored by: Miss Ruth Lawrence, great-niece of Capt. James Lawrence
- Commissioned: 7 April 1903
- Decommissioned: 20 June 1919
- Stricken: 15 September 1919
- Identification: Hull symbol: DD-7; Code letters: NIY
- Fate: Sold, 3 January 1920

General characteristics
- Class & type: Lawrence-class destroyer sub-class of Bainbridge-class destroyer
- Displacement: 400 long tons (410 t) (standard)
- Length: 246 ft 3 in (75.06 m) (oa)
- Beam: 22 ft 3 in (6.78 m)
- Draft: 9 ft 5 in (2.87 m)
- Installed power: 8,400 shp (6,300 kW)
- Propulsion: 2 × Vertical triple expansion engines; 2 × shaft
- Speed: 30 kn (35 mph; 56 km/h)
- Capacity: 108 short tons (98 t) coal
- Complement: 73 officers and enlisted
- Armament: 2 × 3 in (76 mm)/50 caliber guns (removed in 1906 after trials found them to be too heavy for ship); 5 × 6-pounder 57 mm (2.2 in) guns (added 2 more in 1906 when 3" guns were removed); 2 × 18 in (460 mm) torpedo tubes

The third USS Lawrence (DD-8) was a Lawrence-class destroyer, which was a sub-class of Bainbridge-class destroyer, in the United States Navy. She was named for Captain James Lawrence.

== Construction ==
Lawrence was laid down on 10 April 1899, by Fore River Ship & Engine Company, Weymouth, Massachusetts; launched on 7 November 1900; sponsored by Miss Ruth Lawrence, great niece of Captain Lawrence; and commissioned on 7 April 1903.

== Service history ==
=== Pre-World War I ===
Assigned to the 2nd Torpedo Flotilla, Lawrence operated along the Atlantic coast, taking part in the fleet search problem off the New England coast during the summer of 1903. The torpedo boat departed Norfolk on 17 December, and sailed to Key West for winter exercises. On 31 December 1903 while at anchor at Key West she was fouled by the passing steamer Olivette, receiving minor hull damage.

During 1904, she performed Midshipmen cruises and acted as a torpedo practice ship. She continued exercises in the Caribbean and along the Atlantic coast until she decommissioned at Philadelphia on 14 November 1906.

Lawrence recommissioned on 23 July 1907 and resumed training operations out of Norfolk. Departing Hampton Roads on 2 December, she sailed with the torpedo flotilla for winter maneuvers in the Caribbean and off South America. She arrived at San Diego on 28 April 1908 and stood out San Francisco eight days later as the "Great White Fleet" steamed into San Francisco Bay. During the next four years, she operated in the Pacific with the 3rd Torpedo Flotilla patrolling the coast from Canada to Panama and engaged in exercises with the fleet. From 1 June 1912 – 23 April 1914, Lawrence was in commission in reserve.

Returned to full commission status, she departed San Francisco on 25 April to patrol the Mexican coast and protect American and foreign nationals during the Mexican revolution. Returning to Mare Island on 12 September, the destroyer was once again placed in reserve status.

=== World War I ===
After America's entry into World War I, Lawrence was placed in full commission on 13 June 1917 to join coastal defense units. Arriving Balboa, Panama, on 29 July, she guarded the ocean approaches to the Panama Canal Zone until on 30 May 1918, when she steamed toward Key West. Upon her arrival there she operated as coastal escort and patrol ship. After the Armistice, Lawrence steamed to Philadelphia, arriving there on 1 February 1919. She decommissioned on 20 June and was sold to Henry A. Hitner's Sons Company of Philadelphia on 3 January 1920.

== Noteworthy commanding officers ==
- Lieutenant Thomas C. Hart (9 December 1905 – 14 November 1906) (Later Admiral)
- Lieutenant Alfred Graham Howe (1 June 1908 – 27 July 1909) (Later Rear Admiral)
- Lieutenant Daniel E. Barbey (December 1917-7 July 1919) (Later Vice admiral)
