= Truxtun-class destroyer =

Destroyer class of the US Navy

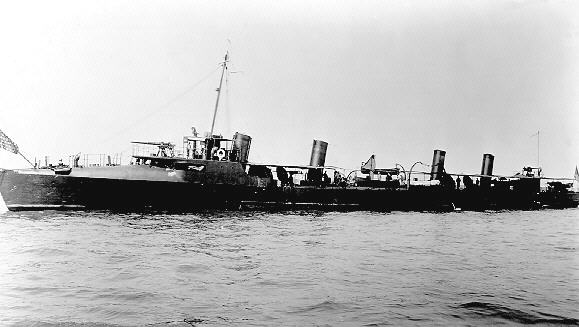
- USS Truxtun

Class overview
- Name: Truxtun class
- Builders: Maryland Steel Company, Sparrows Point, Maryland
- Operators: United States Navy
- Preceded by: Bainbridge class
- Succeeded by: Smith class
- Built: 1899–1902
- In commission: 1902–1919
- Completed: 3
- Retired: 3

General characteristics
- Type: Destroyer
- Displacement: 433 long tons (440 t) normal; 605 long tons (615 t) full load
- Length: 259 ft 6 in (79.10 m)
- Beam: 22 ft 3 in (6.78 m)
- Draft: 6 ft (1.8 m)
- Installed power: 4 × coal-fired Thornycroft boilers; 2 × vertical triple-expansion engines; 8,300 ihp (6,200 kW) (design)
- Propulsion: 2 × shafts
- Speed: 30 knots (56 km/h; 35 mph) (design)
- Capacity: 175 long tons (178 t) coal (fuel)
- Complement: 3 officers; 75 enlisted
- Armament: 2 × 3 in (76 mm)/50 caliber guns; 6 × 6-pounder (57 mm) guns; 2 × 18-inch (450 mm) torpedo tubes, four torpedoes

Three Truxtun-class destroyers were built for the United States Navy. Part of the original 16 destroyers authorized by Congress on 4 May 1898 for the fiscal year 1899 program, they were commissioned in 1902. They were very similar to their Bainbridge-class contemporaries, except for mounting six 6-pounder (57 mm) guns instead of five. They were considered the most successful of the first 16 US Navy destroyers, and were succeeded by the larger Smith class.

The Truxtuns escorted convoys during World War I. All were decommissioned in 1919 and converted to merchant vessels in 1920.

== Design ==
=== Armament ===
The as-built torpedo armament was two 18-inch (457 mm) torpedo tubes with four torpedoes. The gun armament was two 3-inch (76 mm)/50 caliber guns and six 6-pounder (2.2 in (57 mm)) guns.

During World War I the class was equipped with one or two depth charge racks for the convoy escort mission. Also during World War I, the single torpedo tubes were replaced with two twin torpedo tubes on Truxton and Worden, with the number of torpedoes remaining at four. Whipple was modified with one twin torpedo tube mount and four torpedoes at this time.

=== Engineering ===
Truxtun had four Thornycroft boilers supplying 240 psi (1,700 kPa) steam to two vertical triple-expansion engines totaling 8,300 ihp (6,200 kW) (design). She made 29.58 knots (34.0 mph; 54.8 km/h) on trials at 8,300 ihp (6,200 kW). Normal coal capacity was 232 tons.

== Service ==
Truxtun and Whipple served first on the East Coast and later on the West Coast prior to World War I. Worden engaged in reserve training duties on the East Coast and acted as a submarine tender 1914–17. All three served in the Atlantic during the US participation in World War I. Following the Armistice, all were sold in 1920 for scrapping but then converted for merchant use.

=== Merchant Service ===
On 3 Jan 1920, the three were sold for pennies per pound to Henry A. Hitner's Sons Company for scrapping. Instead, Hitner decided to sell them for motor fruit carriers; It made sense as the vessels were shallow enough to maneuver through the narrow fruit company waterways such as the Snyder Canal in Panama, and, with their engineering suite reduced and armament removed, were still fast and economical enough to get the job done. With their old magazines and one of their boiler rooms turned into banana holds, they could hold as many as 15,000 stems of fruit.

The ships were rebuilt, scrapping their old VTE suites and boilers for a pair of economical 12-cylinder Atlas Imperial Diesels—a company known for outfitting tugs and trawlers—generating 211 NHP and allowing a sustained speed of 15 knots. This removed all four of their coal funnels, replacing them with a number of tall cowl vents and a single diesel stack aft. So reconstructed, their weight was listed as 433 GRT with a 264-foot length and 14-foot depth of hold. The crew was reduced to an officer and 17 hands. Painted buff above the waterline to help reflect heat, they still had their greyhound lines. They served in the "Banana Boom" of the 1920s. The sisters were registered in 1921 by Robert Shepherd in Nicaragua and soon used on the banana runs to Galveston and New Orleans, flying the flag of the Snyder Banana Company of Bluefields.

In 1922, the boats had been impounded by R.A. Harvin, the United States Marshal in Texas, after a libel proceeding, and sold at public auction to one Harry Nevelson, who in turn quickly resold them to the Mexican-American Fruit Company, and sometime shortly after they were sailing for the Southern Banana Co.

By 1925, the trio was all part of the Vaccaro brothers’ upstart New Orleans–based Standard Fruit & S S Co (now part of Dole).

By 1933, Lloyds listed Worden as owned by the American Fruit & S S Corp—later adjusted to “Seaboard S S Corp (Standard Fruit, Mgrs)” in subsequent listings—out of Bluefields, Nicaragua with a tonnage of 546 GRT. By 1939 Worden was listed as owned by the Bahamas Shipping Company and with tonnage adjusted to 433 GRT.

=== World War II ===
The Bahamas Shipping Company tried to make Worden as neutral as possible. However, on 1 May 1942 she had a run-in with La Paz, just damaged by U-109. Worden took the damaged ship in tow, after sending a message out reporting the torpedoing. Hereupon many authors seize and claim that U-109 bagged both La Paz and the former destroyer. However, both ships survived, La Paz by being beached, and Worden, undamaged, remained in Lloyd's register. One source says that she was subsequently lost on 1 May 1947, but another record has her as scrapped in 1956.

Her sister Truxtun was lost on 5 September 1938 and Whipple were scrapped in 1956.

== Ships in class ==
Note that, although the ships are listed below with the prefix "DD-" before their official numbers, this classification was not created until 1911, and until then these vessels were officially categorised as "Destroyer No. 14" to "Destroyer No. 16".

Ships of the Truxton destroyer class
Ship	Shipyard	Laid down	Launched	Commissioned	Decommissioned	Fate
USS Truxtun (DD-14)	Maryland Steel Company, Sparrows Point, Maryland	13 November 1899	15 August 1901	11 September 1902	18 July 1919	Sold to Henry A. Hitner's Sons Company for merchant conversion
USS Whipple (DD-15)	Maryland Steel Company	13 November 1899	15 August 1901	21 October 1902	7 July 1919	Sold to Henry A. Hitner's Sons Company for merchant conversion
USS Worden (DD-16)	Maryland Steel Company	13 November 1899	15 August 1901	31 December 1902	13 July 1919	Sold to Henry A. Hitner's Sons Company for merchant conversion

== See also ==
- Bainbridge-class destroyer

== Bibliography ==
- Bauer, K. Jack; Roberts, Stephen S. (1991). Register of Ships of the U.S. Navy, 1775–1990: Major Combatants. Westport, Connecticut: Greenwood Press. pp. 168–169. ISBN 0-313-26202-0.
- Friedman, Norman (2004). US Destroyers: An Illustrated Design History (Revised ed.). Annapolis: Naval Institute Press. ISBN 1-55750-442-3.
- Gardiner, Robert; Chesneau, Roger (1979). Conway's All the World's Fighting Ships 1860–1905. New York: Mayflower Books. ISBN 0-8317-0302-4.
- Silverstone, Paul H. (1970). U.S. Warships of World War I. London: Ian Allan. ISBN 0-71100-095-6.
