= Bainbridge-class destroyer =

Destroyer class of the US Navy

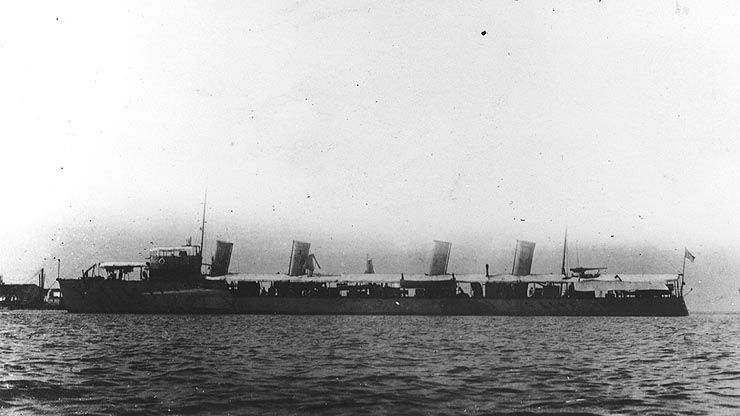
- USS Bainbridge

Class overview
- Name: Bainbridge class
- Builders: Neafie & Levy, PA (3); Union Iron Works, CA (3); William R. Trigg Company, VA (2); Harlan and Hollingsworth, DE (2); Fore River Ship & Engine Co., MA (2); Gas Engine and Power Co., NY (1)
- Operators: United States Navy
- Preceded by: None
- Succeeded by: Truxtun class
- Subclasses: Hopkins; Lawrence; Paul Jones; Stewart
- Built: 1899–1903
- In commission: 1902–1919
- Completed: 13
- Lost: 1
- Retired: 12

General characteristics
- Type: Torpedo Boat Destroyer
- Displacement: 420 long tons (427 t) (normal); 630 long tons (640 t) (full load)
- Length: 250 ft (76 m)
- Beam: 23 ft 1 in (7.04 m)
- Draft: 6 ft 6 in (1.98 m)
- Installed power: 4 × coal-fired Thornycroft boilers; 8,000 ihp (6,000 kW)
- Propulsion: 2 × vertical triple-expansion engines; 2 × propellers
- Speed: 29 knots (54 km/h; 33 mph) (as designed)
- Capacity: 213 long tons (216 t) coal (fuel)
- Complement: 3 officers; 72 enlisted men
- Armament: 2 × 3 in (76 mm)/50 caliber guns; 5 × 6 pounder (57 mm (2.2 in)) guns; 2 × 18-inch (450 mm) torpedo tubes, four torpedoes

The Bainbridge-class destroyers were a class of United States Navy Torpedo Boat Destroyers (TBDs) built between 1899 and 1903. The first class so designated, they comprised the first 13 of 16 TBDs authorized by Congress in 1898 following the Spanish–American War (the remaining three authorised comprised the Truxtun-class destroyers). One ship of the class was lost at sea during service in World War I: Chauncey, which collided with the British merchant ship SS Rose in 1917. The balance were decommissioned in 1919 and sold postwar in 1920, eleven to Joseph G. Hitner of Philadelphia, and the Hopkins to the Denton Shore Lumber Company in Tampa, Florida.

== Subclasses ==
Some sources subdivide the Bainbridge class into subsidiary classes based on their builders' differing designs.

- the first five vessels – Bainbridge, Barry, Chauncey, Dale and Decatur – shared a raised forecastle and had two widely spaced pairs of funnels.
- Hopkins and Hull had a turtledeck forward and may be considered to be Hopkins class. These had their two single torpedo tubes replaced by two twin torpedo tubes during World War I; total torpedoes remained at four.
- Lawrence and Macdonough had a turtledeck forward, Fore River boilers, carried their funnels in only one group of four, and may be considered to be Lawrence class. In 1906 two additional 6-pounder guns were substituted for the two 3-inch guns to save weight.
- Paul Jones, Perry and Preble carried one twin torpedo tube instead of two singles beginning in World War I and may be considered to be Paul Jones class.
- Stewart was equipped with Seabury boilers and was the fastest of the 400-tonners on trials at 29.7 kn (55.0 km/h; 34.2 mph), but her trial displacement of 444 long tons (451 t) is described as unrealistically light.

== Design ==
=== Origins ===
Some references, including contemporary ones, describe four ocean-going torpedo boats launched in 1898–1899 as the first US destroyers based on their tonnage, which ranged from 235 to 340 long tons (239 to 345 t). These were Farragut, Stringham, Goldsborough, and Bailey. Stringham, the largest of these, was larger than some contemporary British destroyers. However, at 420 long tons (430 t) the Bainbridges were considerably larger and had a significantly greater gun armament than the four 6-pounders of the torpedo boats.

The Bainbridge class were produced on the recommendation of an 1898 war plans board formed to prosecute the Spanish–American War and chaired by Assistant Secretary of the Navy Theodore Roosevelt. The poor sea-keeping qualities of existing torpedo boats (such as the 165-long-ton (168 t) Porter) and the existence of Spanish torpedo boat destroyers (such as the 370-long-ton (380 t) Furor) were cited as reasons for the US to build its own destroyers. The 13 Bainbridges were officially designated as the Navy's first TBDs when authorized by an Act of Congress on 4 May 1898 under the fiscal year 1899 program (with the remaining three being Truxtun-class).

Due to construction difficulties the Bainbridges were completed 1901–02, thus too late for the Spanish–American War. However, the destroyer type was thereby instituted in the US Navy, as it had been in the Royal Navy around 1893 with the "26-knotter" torpedo-boat destroyers and the follow-on "27-knotters", of which the survivors of the later group in 1913 were redesignated as the "A" class destroyers. No further torpedo boats were constructed for the US Navy until the outbreak of World War II in Europe, and by then they had no design relationship to destroyers (see PT boats). The Imperial German Navy of 1898–1918 used the term "torpedo boat" for anything up to a large destroyer in size.

=== Armament ===
At 420 long tons normal displacement, the Bainbridges were twice as big as most previous torpedo boats. The extra displacement was used for a greatly increased gun armament and a sufficient engineering plant to rival the torpedo boats in speed (28 kn (52 km/h; 32 mph) vs. 29 kn (54 km/h; 33 mph)). The torpedo armament remained at two 18-inch (457 mm) torpedo tubes; although the torpedo boat's mission was being transferred to the destroyer, apparently increased gun armament was more important to the designers than increased torpedo armament.

The gun armament of two 3-inch (76 mm)/50 caliber guns and five 6-pounder (57 mm (2 in)) guns was a great increase over the four 6-pounder guns of the torpedo boat Farragut. It reflected a desire to quickly disable torpedo boats before they could get within range of friendly battleships. Future destroyer classes included progressive increases in armament.

The class was equipped with one or two depth charge racks during World War I for their anti-submarine warfare (ASW) mission.

=== Engineering ===
The best available technologies of coal-fired boilers and triple-expansion engines were used for propulsion, although steam turbines would be adopted in the next generation of US destroyers, beginning with the Smith class launched in 1908. The need for faster destroyers was to be a significant driver of naval propulsion technology throughout the type's future development.

Bainbridge had four Thornycroft boilers supplying 275 psi (1,900 kPa) steam to two triple-expansion engines totaling 7,000 ihp (5,200 kW) (design). She made 28.45 kn (52.69 km/h; 32.74 mph) on trials at 8,000 ihp (6,000 kW). Normal coal capacity was 213 long tons (216 t).

Hopkins also had four Thornycroft boilers supplying steam to two triple-expansion engines totaling 7,000 ihp (design). She made 29.02 kn (53.75 km/h; 33.40 mph) on trials at 8,456 ihp (6,306 kW). Normal coal capacity was lower though, at 150 long tons (150 t).

Lawrence had four Normand boilers supplying steam to two triple-expansion engines totaling 8,400 ihp (6,300 kW) (design). She made 28.41 kn (52.62 km/h; 32.69 mph) on trials 8,400 ihp. Normal coal capacity was even lower, at only 115 long tons (117 t).

An interesting note on destroyers is that they have continuously increased in size since their inception. The Bainbridges were under 650 long tons (660 t) full load; some Arleigh Burke-class destroyers in service in 2013 displace 10,800 long tons (11,000 t) full load, more than the standard displacement limit on 1920s Pensacola class "Treaty cruisers".

== Service ==
A few Bainbridges were deployed to the Philippines 1904–1917. During the US participation in World War I, these were redeployed to the Mediterranean as convoy escorts. Others of the class served in the Atlantic, on the US East Coast, or guarded the Panama Canal. Chauncey collided with the British merchant ship SS Rose in 1917 and was lost. Following the Armistice, the remainder were sold for scrapping or merchant conversion in 1920.

== Ships in class ==
The ships were given the prefix "DD-" before their official numbers, on 17 July 1920, after they had all been decommissioned.

Ships of the Bainbridge destroyer class
| Name | Hull class and no. | Builder | Laid down | Launched | Commissioned | Decommissioned | Fate |
|---|---|---|---|---|---|---|---|
| Bainbridge | Destroyer No. 1 | Neafie and Levy Ship and Engine Building Company, Philadelphia | 15 August 1899 | 27 August 1901 | 12 February 1903 | 15 September 1919 | Sold to Henry A. Hitner's Sons Company for merchant conversion |
| Barry | Destroyer No. 2 | Neafie and Levy Ship and Engine Building Company, Philadelphia | 2 September 1899 | 22 March 1902 | 24 November 1902 | 28 June 1919 | Sold to Henry A. Hitner's Sons Company |
| Chauncey | Destroyer No. 3 | Neafie and Levy Ship and Engine Building Company, Philadelphia | 2 December 1899 | 26 October 1901 | 21 February 1903 | 19 November 1917 (sunk) | Sunk in collision with British SS Rose |
| Dale | Destroyer No. 4 | William R. Trigg Company, Richmond, Virginia | 12 July 1899 | 24 July 1900 | 13 February 1903 | 9 July 1919 | Sold to Henry A. Hitner's Sons Company |
| Decatur | Destroyer No. 5 | William R. Trigg Company, Richmond, Virginia | 26 July 1899 | 26 September 1900 | 19 May 1902 | 20 June 1919 | Sold to Henry A. Hitner's Sons Company |
| Hopkins | Destroyer No. 6 | Harlan & Hollingsworth Company, Wilmington, Delaware | 2 February 1899 | 24 April 1902 | 23 September 1903 | 20 June 1919 | Sold to Denton Shore Lumber Co., Tampa, FLorida |
| Hull | Destroyer No. 7 | Harlan & Hollingsworth Company, Wilmington, Delaware | 22 February 1899 | 21 June 1902 | 20 May 1903 | 7 July 1919 | Sold to Henry A. Hitner's Sons Company |
| Lawrence | Destroyer No. 8 | Fore River Ship & Engine Company, Quincy, Massachusetts | 10 April 1899 | 7 November 1900 | 7 April 1903 | 20 June 1919 | Sold to Henry A. Hitner's Sons Company |
| Macdonough | Destroyer No. 9 | Fore River Ship & Engine Company, Quincy, Massachusetts | 10 April 1899 | 24 December 1900 | 5 September 1903 | 3 September 1919 | Sold to Henry A. Hitner's Sons Company for scrapping |
| Paul Jones | Destroyer No. 10 | Union Iron Works, San Francisco, California | 20 April 1899 | 14 June 1902 | 19 July 1902 | 15 September 1919 | Sold to Henry A. Hitner's Sons Company for scrapping |
| Perry | Destroyer No. 11 | Union Iron Works, San Francisco, California | 19 April 1899 | 27 October 1900 | 4 September 1902 | 2 July 1919 | Sold to Henry A. Hitner's Sons Company for scrapping |
| Preble | Destroyer No. 12 | Union Iron Works, San Francisco, California | 21 April 1899 | 2 March 1901 | 14 December 1903 | 11 July 1919 | Sold to Henry A. Hitner's Sons Company |
| Stewart | Destroyer No. 13 | Gas Engine and Power Company, Morris Heights, New York | 24 January 1900 | 10 May 1902 | 1 December 1902 | 9 July 1919 | Sold to Henry A. Hitner's Sons Company for scrapping |

== See also ==
- Truxtun-class destroyer

== Bibliography ==
- Bauer, K. Jack; Roberts, Stephen S. (1991). Register of Ships of the U.S. Navy, 1775-1990: Major Combatants. Westport, Connecticut: Greenwood Press. ISBN 0-313-26202-0.
- Friedman, Norman (2004). US Destroyers: An Illustrated Design History (Revised ed.). Annapolis: Naval Institute Press. ISBN 1-55750-442-3.
- Gardiner, Robert; Chesneau, Roger (1979). Conway's All the World's Fighting Ships 1860–1905. New York: Mayflower Books. ISBN 0-8317-0302-4.
- Simpson, Richard V. Building The Mosquito Fleet, The US Navy's First Torpedo Boats. Charleston, South Carolina:Arcadia Publishing, 2001, ISBN 0-7385-0508-0.
- Silverstone, Paul H. (1970). U.S. Warships of World War I. London: Ian Allan. ISBN 0-71100-095-6.
