= USS Preble (DD-12) =

Bainbridge-class destroyer

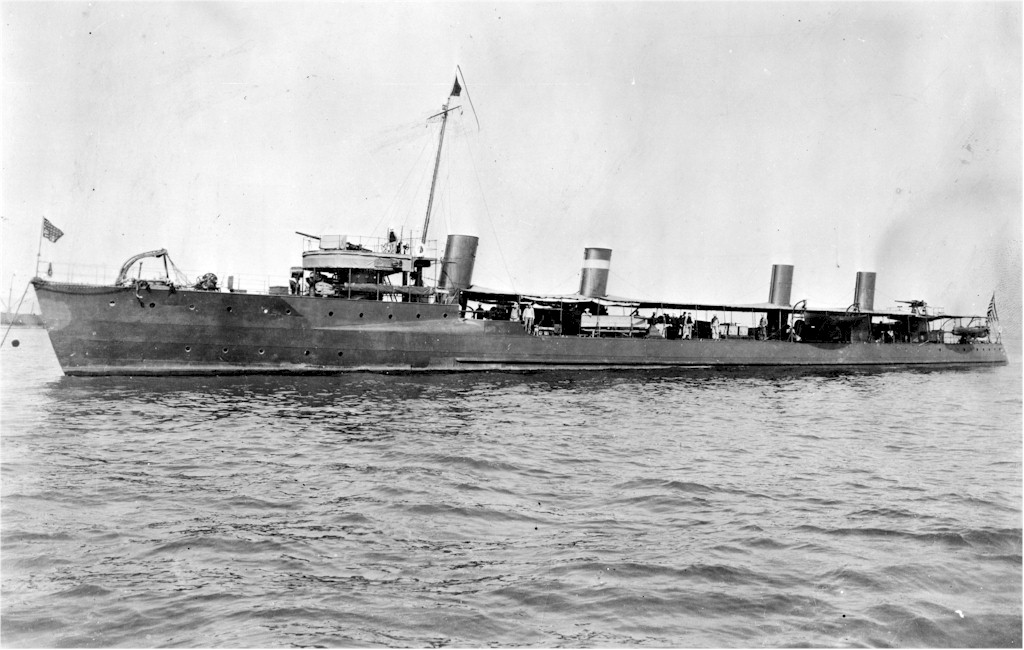
- USS Preble

History

United States
- Name: Preble
- Namesake: Commodore Edward Preble awarded Congressional Gold Medal
- Builder: Union Iron Works, San Francisco
- Laid down: 21 April 1899
- Launched: 2 March 1901
- Commissioned: 14 December 1903
- Decommissioned: 11 July 1919
- Stricken: 15 September 1919
- Fate: Sold, January 3 1920 for scrapping

General characteristics
- Class & type: Bainbridge-class destroyer
- Displacement: 420 long tons (430 t) (standard); 592 long tons (601 t) (full load)
- Length: 245 ft (74.7 m) (pp); 250 ft (76.2 m) (oa)
- Beam: 23 ft 7 in (7.2 m)
- Draft: 6 ft 6 in (2 m) (mean)
- Installed power: 4 × Thornycroft boilers; 8,000 ihp (6,000 kW)
- Propulsion: 2 × Vertical triple expansion engines; 2 × Propellers
- Speed: 29 kn (54 km/h; 33 mph) (designed speed)
- Complement: 3 officers; 72 enlisted men
- Armament: 2 × 3 in (76 mm)/50 caliber guns; 5 × 6-pounder (57 mm (2.2 in)) guns; 2 × 18 in (457 mm) torpedo tubes
- Notes: She rendered assistance durning the San Francisco earthquake of 1906 and her crew was instrumental in saving the city’s water front.

The third USS Preble was a Bainbridge-class destroyer in commission in the United States Navy from 1903 to 1919. She was named for Commodore Edward Preble. She saw service in World War I.

== Construction and commissioning ==
Preble was laid down by the Union Iron Works at San Francisco, California, on 21 April 1899. She was launched on 2 March 1901, sponsored by Miss Ethel Preble, and commissioned on 14 December 1903.

== Service history ==
=== 1903–1917 ===
Preble was assigned to the United States Pacific Fleet and operated with the 4th and 2nd Torpedo Flotillas off the west coast of North America from Washington to the Panama Canal Zone until 1908, making a cruise to Hawaii and American Samoa from 24 August to November 1908. On returning, she operated along the United States West Coast until 4 February 1909, when she arrived at Mare Island Navy Yard on Mare Island in Vallejo, California, for inactivation. She was in reserve on 23 February 1909.

Reactivated on 17 September 1909, Preble was reassigned to the Pacific Torpedo Flotilla and operated with it until 1913. Placed in reserve again on 19 June 1913, she remained at Mare Island until resuming operations with the torpedo flotilla on 23 April 1914. She observed the Mexican Revolution′s Topolobampo Campaign between Mexican Huertista and Constitutionalist forces in the Gulf of California and was present at the Fourth Battle of Topolobampo, the final naval action of the campaign.

Torpedo practice, gunnery exercises, and minesweeping operations followed. During the summer of 1915, Preble participated in a cruise to Alaskan waters to gather logistic information. She began another period in reserve on 25 October 1916.

=== World War I ===
With entry of the United States into World War I looming, Preble was reactivated on 3 April 1917. On 6 April, the United States entered the war.

Preble departed San Diego, California, on 30 April 1917 for the United States East Coast. She arrived at Norfolk, Virginia, on 13 July 1917 and began coastwise convoy duty in the Atlantic Ocean along the mid-Atlantic coast of the United States.

Preble was involved in a friendly fire incident in July 1918. She was one of the escorts of a convoy of five troop transports carrying U.S. troops to Europe which departed New York City on 21 July. In the predawn hours of 23 July, the U.S. Navy submarine USS N-3 was on the surface in the Atlantic Ocean, charging her batteries in calm, hazy weather with bright moonlight, when she suddenly sighted one of the ships of the convoy at 02:55 at a range of only 1,800 yards (1,650 m). The British armed transport Minnekahda, carrying 3,800 U.S. troops, soon also appeared, headed straight at N-3 and only about 200 yards (183 m) away. N-3 immediately made a preliminary recognition signal by firing a green flare, then sent a recognition signal by blinker light. Minnekahda did not respond except to blow her steam whistle. N-3′s crew heard someone aboard Minnekahda order "Fire!" As N-3 continued to flash the recognition signal by blinker light, N-3′s commanding officer hailed Minnekahda, calling out "Don't fire, this is an American submarine!" At that instant, one of Minnekahda′s guns fired a 6-inch (152 mm) or 7.5-inch (191 mm) round (according to different sources), and the shell hit N-3 forward at the waterline, failing to explode but inflicting considerable damage and causing leaks. Minnekahda closed to a range of 50 yards (46 m), close enough for N-3′s crew to see men aboard Minnekahda and hear them receive an order to load. As N-3 continued to flash the recognition signal, several men on N3′s deck yelled "Don't fire!" and "Don't shoot, this is the N-3!" Finally, someone on Minnekahda asked where N-3′s flag was. N-3′s crew immediately brought a United States flag on deck and shined a light on it. Minnekahda promptly ceased fire. Preble then approached at flank speed as if to ram N-3, and N-3 made recognition signals and backed at full speed, avoiding a collision with Preble by only a few feet. N-3 hailed Preble, which stopped and sent a boat to N-3 to assess her damage. N-3 had suffered no crew casualties, but Minnekahda′s unexploded shell was found in N-3′s forward superstructure, and N-3′s torpedo compartment was partially flooded. After pumping 2,800 US gallons (2,331 imp gal; 10,599 L) of diesel fuel overboard to lighten herself forward, N-3 proceeded to port on the surface under her own power.

Preble continued her convoy escort operations off the Mid-Atlantic coast of the United States through 11 November 1918, when the armistice with Germany brought World War I to a close.

== Decommissioning and disposal ==
Remaining on the U.S. East Coast after World War I, Preble was decommissioned at New York City on 11 July 1919. Her name was struck from the Navy List on 15 September 1919, and she was sold on 3 January 1920 to Henry A. Hitner's Sons Company of Philadelphia, Pennsylvania, for scrapping.

== Honors and awards ==
- Mexican Service Medal
- World War I Victory Medal

Preble received the Mexican Service Medal for service from 2 May to 16 August 1914, from 19 to 20 Apr 1916, and from 18 July to 22 August 1916 and the World War I Victory Medal for service from 10 May to 9 November 1918.

== Noteworthy commanding officer ==
- Lieutenant (later Commodore) Harry Adrian McClure (3 May 1916–November 1916)
