= USS Hopkins (DD-6) =

Hopkins-class destroyer

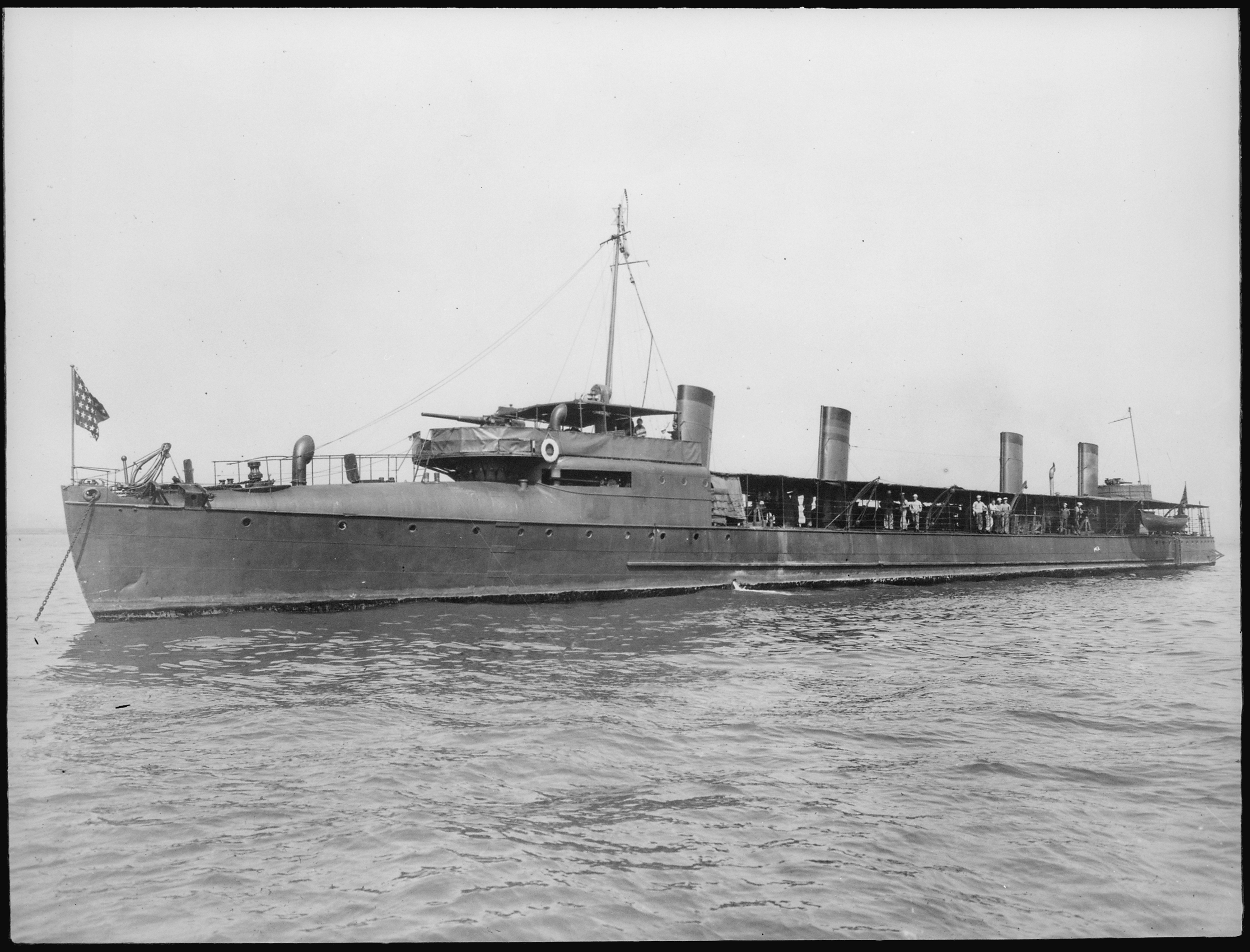
- USS Hopkins (DD-6) at anchor, c. 1904.

History

United States
- Name: Hopkins
- Namesake: Commedore Esek Hopkins
- Builder: Harlan and Hollingsworth, Wilmington, Delaware
- Laid down: 2 February 1899
- Launched: 24 April 1902
- Commissioned: 23 September 1903
- Decommissioned: 20 June 1919
- Stricken: 2 October 1919
- Fate: Sold, 7 September 1920 and broken up for scrap

General characteristics
- Class & type: Hopkins-class destroyer sub-class of Bainbridge-class destroyer
- Displacement: 408 long tons (415 t) (standard)
- Length: 248 ft 8 in (75.79 m) (oa)
- Beam: 24 ft 6 in (7.47 m)
- Draft: 10 ft 6 in (3.20 m)
- Installed power: 7,200 shp (5,400 kW)
- Propulsion: 2 × Vertical triple expansion engines; 2 × shaft
- Speed: 29 kn (33 mph; 54 km/h)
- Complement: 73 officers and enlisted
- Armament: 2 × 3 in (76 mm)/50 caliber guns; 5 × 6-pounder 57 mm (2.2 in) guns; 2 × 18 in (460 mm) torpedo tubes

USS Hopkins (DD-6) was a Hopkins-class destroyer, which was a sub-class of the Bainbridge-class destroyer, in the United States Navy. She was the first of three Navy vessels named in honor of Commodore of the Continental Navy Esek Hopkins.

== Construction ==
Hopkins was launched by Harlan & Hollingsworth Company, Wilmington, Delaware, on 24 April 1902, and sponsored by Alice Gould Hawes, a great-great-granddaughter of Esek Hopkins. The ship was commissioned at Philadelphia Navy Yard on 23 September 1903, with Lieutenant Montgomery M. Taylor in command.

== Pre-World War I ==
Hopkins sailed from Philadelphia on 12 May 1904, and joined the Fleet at Norfolk. That summer the destroyer deployed with the Coast Squadron for the midshipmen at sea training. During the following three years she ranged into the Caribbean Sea, exercising with the Flotilla, engaging in torpedo practice, and Fleet problems. In September 1906, Hopkins was present for the Presidential Review off Oyster Bay. On 29 September, she and Lawrence escorted the President in Mayflower to Cape Cod Bay to witness record target practice. In 1907–1908, Hopkins – as part of the Torpedo Flotilla – accompanied the Atlantic Fleet on a practice cruise to the Pacific. They sailed from Hampton Roads on 2 December 1907, exchanging courtesies at various Mexican and South American ports en route. After target practice in Magdelena Bay, the Flotilla arrived at San Francisco on 6 May 1908, in time for the review of the combined Atlantic and Pacific Fleets by the Secretary of the Navy. On 1 June of that year, Hopkins joined the Pacific Torpedo Fleet for tactics along the West Coast, at sea training north to Alaskan waters, and south to the coast of Mexico.

On 14 February 1910, Hopkins suffered a boiler accident. Two sailors, Chief Watertender Robert Earl Bonney and Watertender Edward Alvin Clary, were awarded the Medal of Honor for their actions during the incident.

== World War I ==
On 30 April 1917, after the United States entry into World War I, Hopkins departed San Diego for the Panama Canal Zone. She performed patrol duty, convoyed submarines and assisted them in torpedo proving. On 3 August, she arrived at Hampton Roads, for escort and patrol ranging along the coast to Bermuda.

Hopkins entered the Philadelphia Navy Yard on 29 January 1919, and decommissioned there 20 June. She was sold for scrapping on 7 September 1920 to the Denton Shore Lumber Company.

== Noteworthy commanding officers ==
- Lieutenant commander Montgomery M. Taylor (24 October 1902 – 13 February 1903) (Later Admiral)
- Lieutenant Alfred G. Howe (3 December 1906 – 1 June 1908) (Later Rear Admiral)
- Lieutenant Harold G. Bowen, Sr. (15 March 1910 – 5 September 1911) (Later Vice Admiral)
- Lieutenant junior grade James L. Kauffman (1 November 1912 – 4 January 1914) (Later Vice Admiral)
- Lieutenant commander Robert G. Tobin (24 October 1918 – 20 June 1919) (Later Rear Admiral)
