= Coast Squadron =

Naval unit

The Coast Squadron was a unit in the United States Navy in the early 20th century.

It was organized under the North Atlantic Fleet which also included the Battleship and Caribbean Squadrons. The Coast Squadron was established on May 19, 1903 for coastal defence and to support the US Navy's operations in the West Indies. The Coast Squadron was based in Key West, Florida. Its flagship was the battleship Texas, it also include the battleship Indiana, the monitors Arkansas, Nevada and Florida and five destroyers.

== Commanders ==
- James H. Sands, May 1903 – March 1905
- Francis W. Dickins, March 1905 – April 1906
