= Henry A. Hitner's Sons Company =

Henry A. Hitner's Sons Company owned an iron works in Philadelphia.

The company was established by Henry Adam Hitner and incorporated on 28 December 1906. It purchased many retired United States Navy ships in the early 1900s, converting some of them to merchant ships and scrapping others.

Joseph G. Hitner became a member of the company in 1904 and by April 1919 was president of the company.

In February 1925 a creditors' committee which had controlled the company for the preceding 18 months was dissolved and the stockholders resumed control with Joseph G. Hitner remaining as president.

The company was later renamed the Hitner Industrial Dismantling Company.

== Partial list of ships scrapped ==
- USS Santee
- USS Holland
- USS Smith
- Yacht Columbia
- USS Wisconsin
- USS Nevada
- USS Raleigh
- USS SC-1
- USS SC-26
- USS Miantonomoh
- All three World War I era Truxtun-class destroyers
- Eleven of the thirteen World War I era Bainbridge-class destroyers
