= List of torpedo boats of the United States Navy =

Ships of the United States Navy

Ships in current service
- Current ships

Ships grouped alphabetically
- A–B; C; D–F; G–H; I–K; L; M; N–O; P; Q–R; S; T–V; W–Z

Ships grouped by type
- Aircraft carriers; Airships; Amphibious warfare ships; Auxiliaries; Battlecruisers; Battleships; Cruisers; Destroyers; Destroyer escorts; Destroyer leaders; Escort carriers; Frigates; Hospital ships; Littoral combat ships; Mine warfare vessels; Monitors; Oilers; Patrol vessels; Registered civilian vessels; Sailing frigates; Steam frigates; Steam gunboats; Ships of the line; Sloops of war; Submarines; Torpedo boats; Torpedo retrievers; Unclassified miscellaneous; Yard and district craft

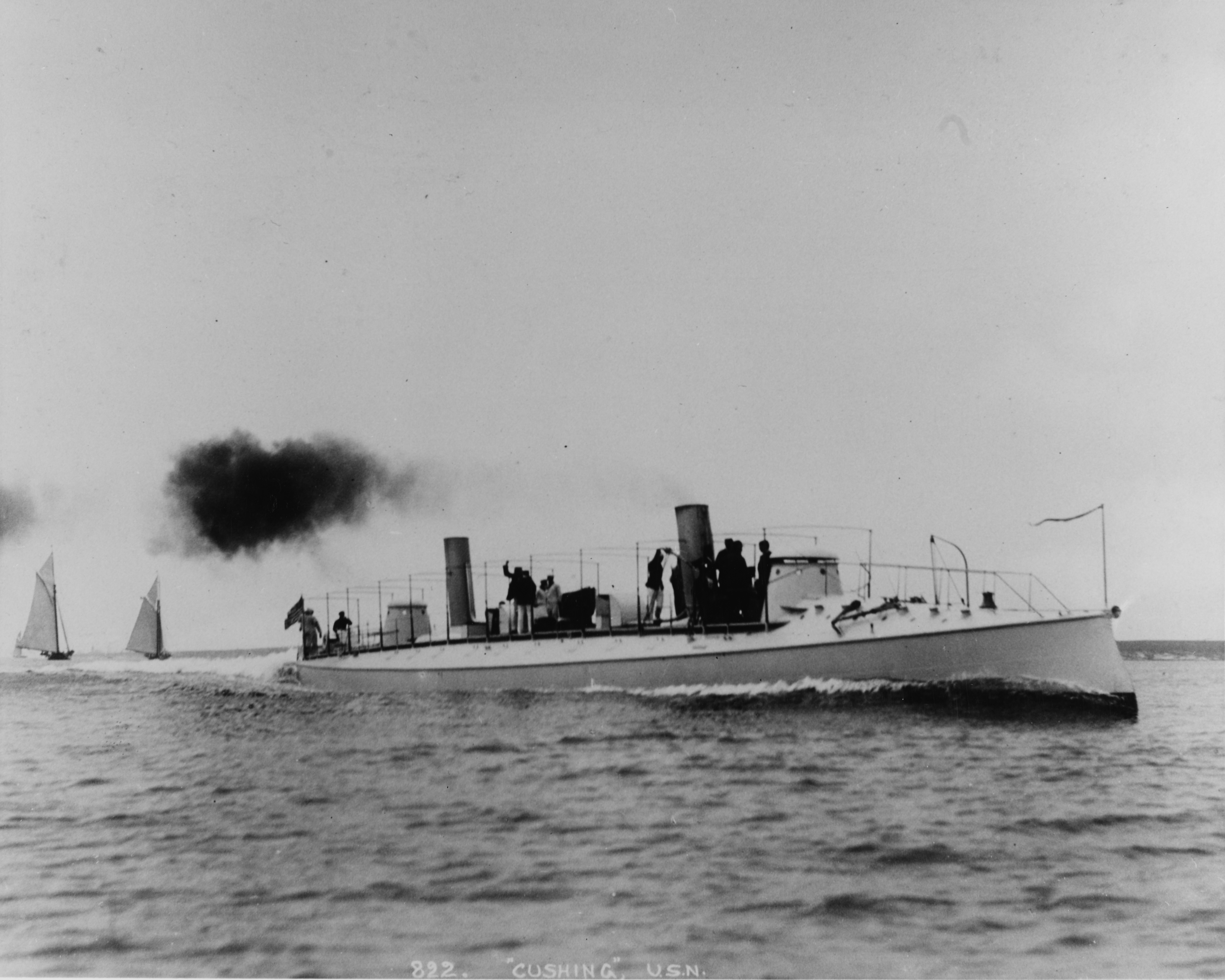
USS Cushing (TB-1)

This list of steam-driven torpedo boats of the United States Navy includes all ships with the hull classification symbol TB, running from TB-1 of 1890 to TB-35 of 1901. It does not include the Patrol Torpedo (PT) boats of World War II.

The first torpedo-boat to serve with the United States Navy was the experimental Stiletto of 31 tons, built in 1885-86 as a yacht by the Herreschoff Manufacturing Company, Bristol, Rhode Island. Designated WTB-1 (for "Wooden Torpedo Boat"), she was purchased under the Act of 3 March 1887 for use as a torpedo boat for experimental purposes and commissioned in July 1887. She measured 94 ft overall (88 ft 6in waterline) x 11 ft 6in x 3 ft, and had a 1-shaft vertical compound engine of 359 ihp, achieving 18.2 knots. She was stricken on 27 January 1911 and sold on 18 July 1911.

The authorisation for the following steel torpedo-boats was as follows:

- Act of 3 August 1886: TB-1
- Act of 30 June 1890: TB-2
- Act of 26 July 1894: TB-3 to TB-5
- Act of 2 March 1895: TB-6 to TB-8
- Act of 10 June 1896: TB-9 to TB-18
- Act of 3 March 1897: TB-19 to TB-23
- Act of 4 May 1898: TB-24 to TB-35 (also the first sixteen TBDs - see Bainbridge-class destroyer)

== Re-classification in 1918 ==
On 1 August 1918 all 17 surviving torpedo boats were redesignated as Coast Torpedo Boats and given numbers in place of their original names and were subsequently sold for breaking up in 1919 and 1920.

== Cushing class torpedo boat ==
- USS Cushing (TB-1)

== Ericsson class torpedo boat ==
- USS Ericsson (TB-2)

== Foote class torpedo boats ==
- USS Foote (TB-3)
- USS Rodgers (TB-4)
- USS Winslow (TB-5)

== Porter class torpedo boats ==
- USS Porter (TB-6)
- USS Du Pont (TB-7)

== Rowan class torpedo boat ==
- USS Rowan (TB-8)

== Dahlgren class torpedo boats ==
- USS Dahlgren (TB-9)
- USS Craven (TB-10)

== Farragut class torpedo boat ==
- USS Farragut (TB-11)

== Davis class torpedo boats ==
- USS Davis (TB-12)
- USS Fox (TB-13)

== Morris class torpedo boat ==
- USS Morris (TB-14)

== Talbot class torpedo boats ==
- USS Talbot (TB-15)
- USS Gwin (TB-16)

== MacKenzie class torpedo boats ==
- USS MacKenzie (TB-17)
- USS McKee (TB-18)

== Stringham class torpedo boat ==
- USS Stringham (TB-19)

== Goldsborough class torpedo boat ==
- USS Goldsborough (TB-20)

== Bailey class torpedo boat ==
- USS Bailey (TB-21)

== Somers class torpedo boat ==
- USS Somers (TB-22)

== Manley class torpedo boat ==
- USS Manley (TB-23)

== Bagley class torpedo boats ==
- USS Bagley (TB-24)
- USS Barney (TB-25)
- USS Biddle (TB-26)

== Blakely class torpedo boats ==
- USS Blakely (TB-27)
- USS DeLong (TB-28)
- USS Nicholson (TB-29)
- USS O'Brien (TB-30)
- USS Shubrick (TB-31)
- USS Stockton (TB-32)
- USS Thornton (TB-33)
- USS Tingey (TB-34)
- USS Wilkes (TB-35)

== List of torpedo boats ==
Hull No.	Ship Name	Shipyard	Authorised	Laid down	Launched	Commissioned	Fate
TB-1	Cushing	Herreshoff, Bristol, Rhode Island	3 August 1886	April 1888	23 January 1890	22 April 1890	Stricken 6 April 1912; sunk as target 24 September 1920.
TB-2	Ericsson	Iowa Iron Works, Dubuque, Iowa	30 June 1890	21 July 1892	12 May 1894	18 February 1897	Stricken 6 April 1912; sunk as target.
TB-3	Foote	Columbian Iron Works, Baltimore, Maryland	26 July 1894	1 May 1896	1 October 1896	7 August 1897	Renamed CTB-1 on 1 August 1918; sold 19 July 1920.
TB-4	Rodgers	Columbian Iron Works, Baltimore, Maryland	26 July 1894	6 May 1896	10 November 1896	1 April 1898	Renamed CTB-2 on 1 August 1918; sold 19 July 1920.
TB-5	Winslow	Columbian Iron Works, Baltimore, Maryland	26 July 1894	8 May 1896	6 January 1897	29 December 1897	Stricken 12 July 1910 and sold in January 1911.
TB-6	Porter	Herreshoff, Bristol, Rhode Island	2 March 1895	February 1896	9 September 1896	20 February 1897	Stricken 7 November 1912 and sold 30 December 1912.
TB-7	DuPont	Herreshoff, Bristol, Rhode Island	2 March 1895	February 1896	30 March 1897	3 September 1897	Renamed CTB-3 on 1 August 1918; sold 19 July 1920.
TB-8	Rowan	Moran Brothers, Seattle, Washington	2 March 1895	22 June 1896	8 April 1898	1 April 1899	Stricken 29 October 1912 and used as target, sold 3 June 1918.
TB-9	Dahlgren	Bath Iron Works, Bath, Maine	10 June 1896	11 December 1897	29 May 1899	16 June 1900	Renamed CTB-4 on 1 August 1918; sold 19 July 1920.
TB-10	Craven	Bath Iron Works, Bath, Maine	10 June 1896	6 December 1897	25 September 1899	9 June 1900	Stricken 14 November 1913 and sunk as target in 1913.
TB-11	Farragut	Union Iron Works, San Francisco	10 June 1896	26 July 1897	16 July 1898	22 March 1899	Renamed CTB-5 on 1 August 1918; sold 9 September 1919.
TB-12	Davis	Wolf & Zwicker, Portland, Oregon	10 June 1896	2 March 1897	4 June 1898	10 May 1899	Stricken 12 November 1913; sold 21 April 1920
TB-13	Fox	Wolf & Zwicker, Portland, Oregon	10 June 1896	4 March 1897	4 July 1898	8 July 1899	Stricken 31 August 1916; sold as mercantile Ace 31 August 1920.
TB-14	Morris	Herreshoff, Bristol, Rhode Island	10 June 1896	19 November 1897	13 April 1898	11 May 1898	Renamed CTB-6 on 1 August 1918; sold 10 October 1924.
TB-15	Talbot	Herreshoff, Bristol, Rhode Island	10 June 1896	8 April 1897	14 November 1897	4 April 1898	Renamed USS Berceau (YFB 3) 11 April 1918; sold 18 July 1944.
TB-16	Gwin	Herreshoff, Bristol, Rhode Island	10 June 1896	14 April 1897	15 November 1897	4 April 1898	Renamed USS Cyane (YFB 4) 11 April 1918; sold 24 September 1925.
TB-17	MacKenzie	Charles Hillman Co., Philadelphia, Pa.	10 June 1896	15 April 1897	19 February 1898	1 May 1899	Stricken 10 March 1916 and used as target.
TB-18	McKee	Columbian Iron Works, Baltimore, Maryland	10 June 1896	11 September 1897	5 March 1898	16 May 1898	Stricken 6 April 1912 and used as target; sunk 24 September 1920.
TB-19	Stringham	Harlan & Hollingsworth, Wilmington, Delaware	3 March 1897	21 March 1898	10 June 1899	7 November 1905	Stricken 26 November 1915 and used as target ship 1915; sold 18 March 1923.
TB-20	Goldsborough	Wolf & Zwicker, Portland, Oregon; completed by Puget Sound Navy Yard	3 March 1897	14 July 1898	29 July 1899	9 April 1908	Renamed CTB-7 on 1 August 1918; sold 8 September 1919.
TB-21	Bailey	Gas Engine & Power Co., Morris Heights, N.Y.	3 March 1897	30 April 1898	5 December 1899	10 June 1901	Renamed CTB-8 on 1 August 1918; sold 10 March 1920.
TB-22	Somers	G. Schichau, Elbing, Germany (purchased during Spanish-American War on 25 March 1898)	3 March 1897	1893	1897	28 March 1898	Renamed CTB-9 on 1 August 1918; sold 19 July 1920.
TB-23	Manley	Yarrow & Co, Poplar, London (purchased during Spanish-American War on 13 April 1898)	3 March 1897	-	ca. 1894	never commissioned	Renamed USS Levant (YFB) 11 April 1918; sold 21 April 1920.
TB-24	Bagley	Bath Iron Works, Bath, Maine	4 May 1898	4 January 1900	25 September 1900	18 October 1901	Renamed CTB-10 on 1 August 1918; sold 9 April 1919.
TB-25	Barney	Bath Iron Works, Bath, Maine	4 May 1898	3 January 1900	28 July 1900	21 October 1901	Renamed CTB-11 on 1 August 1918; sold 19 July 1920.
TB-26	Biddle	Bath Iron Works, Bath, Maine	4 May 1898	21 February 1900	18 May 1901	26 October 1901	Renamed CTB-12 on 1 August 1918; sold 19 July 1920.
TB-27	Blakely	George Lawley & Sons, South Boston, Mass.	4 May 1898	12 January 1899	22 November 1900	27 December 1904	Renamed CTB-13 on 1 August 1918; sold 10 March 1920.
TB-28	DeLong	George Lawley & Sons, South Boston, Mass.	4 May 1898	24 January 1899	23 November 1900	12 October 1902	Renamed CTB-14 on 1 August 1918; sold 19 July 1920.
TB-29	Nicholson	Lewis Nixon, Elizabethport, N.J.	4 May 1898	6 December 1898	23 September 1901	10 January 1905	Stricken 3 March 1909 and used as Target No.6.
TB-30	O'Brien	Lewis Nixon, Elizabethport, N.J.	4 May 1898	29 December 1898	24 September 1900	15 July 1905	Stricken 3 March 1909 and used as Target No.5.
TB-31	Shubrick	William R. Trigg Co., Richmond, Va.	4 May 1898	11 March 1899	31 October 1899	31 May 1901 (first log started 19 November 1901)	Renamed CTB-15 on 1 August 1918; sold 10 March 1920.
TB-32	Stockton	William R. Trigg Co., Richmond, Va.	4 May 1898	18 March 1899	27 December 1899	14 March 1901 (first log started 14 November 1901)	Stricken 15 November 1913 and sunk as target September 1916.
TB-33	Thornton	William R. Trigg Co., Richmond, Va.	4 May 1898	16 March 1899	15 May 1900	9 June 1902	Renamed CTB-16 on 1 August 1918; sold 28 August 1920.
TB-34	Tingey	Columbian Iron Works, Baltimore, Maryland	4 May 1898	29 March 1899	25 March 1901	7 January 1904	Renamed CTB-17 on 1 August 1918; sold 10 March 1920.
TB-35	Wilkes	Gas Engine & Power Co., Morris Heights, New York	4 May 1898	3 June 1899	28 September 1901	18 September 1902	Stricken 15 November 1913 and sunk as target 1914.

== See also ==
- PT boat
- United States Navy torpedo retrievers
- List of United States Navy ships
- Cape Flattery-class torpedo trials craft
