= List of ship launches in 1900 =

The list of ship launches in 1900 is a chronological list of ships launched in 1900.

Date	Ship	Class	Builder	Location	Country	Notes
9 January	Torpilleur N° 229	37 metre type Normand (1897 tranche) torpedo boat	Forges et Chantiers de la Méditerranée	Le Havre	France	For the French Navy
19 January	France Marie	Sailing ship	Forges et Chantiers de la Méditerranée	Le Havre	France	For Vimont, A., & Cie.
16 February	Rosario	Steamship	Blyth Shipbuilding & Dry Docks Co. Ltd	Blyth	United Kingdom	For Orders & Handford Steamship Co. Ltd.
28 February	Brest	Steamship	Forges et Chantiers de la Méditerranée	Le Havre	France	For the Cie. des Chemins de Fer de l'Ouest
19 March	Jules Henry	Sailing ship	Forges et Chantiers de la Méditerranée	Le Havre	France	For Vimont, A., & Cie.
20 March	Yatagan	Pique-class destroyer	Ateliers et Chantiers de la Loire	Nantes	France	For the French Navy
22 March	Prinz Heinrich	Armored cruiser	Kaiserliche Werft Kiel	Kiel	Germany	
23 March	Ostrich	Destroyer	Fairfield Shipbuilding and Engineering Company	Govan, Scotland	United Kingdom	Later designated as part of C class
27 March	Montcalm	Gueydon-class cruiser	Forges et Chantiers de la Méditerranée	La Seyne	France	For the French Navy
29 March	Vixen	Avon-class destroyer	Vickers	Barrow-in-Furness	United Kingdom	
31 March	Pique	Pique-class destroyer	Forges et Chantiers de la Méditerranée	Le Havre	France	For the French Navy
31 March	La Savoie	Steamship	Chantiers et Ateliers de Penhoët	Saint-Nazaire	France	For Cie. Générale Transatlantique
April	Torpilleur N° 251	37 metre type Normand (1899 tranche) torpedo boat	Ateliers et Chantiers de la Loire	Nantes	France	For the French Navy
2 April	Devonian	Passenger ship	Harland & Wolff	Belfast	United Kingdom	For F. Leyland & Co.
2 April	Fauconneau	Fauconneau-class destroyer	Chantiers et Ateliers Augustin Normand	Le Havre	France	For the French Navy
3 April	Runic	Passenger ship	Harland & Wolff	Belfast	United Kingdom	For White Star Line.
21 April	Kaiser Barbarossa	Kaiser Friedrich III-class battleship	Schichau	Danzig	Germany	
28 April	Dristigheten	Dristigheten-class coastal defence ship	Lindholmens Shipyard	Lindholmen, Gothenburg	Sweden	
28 April	Dupleix	Dupleix-class cruiser	Arsenal de Rochefort	Rochefort	France	For the French Navy
28 April	Cherbourg	Steamship	Forges et Chantiers de la Méditerranée	Le Havre	France	For the Cie. des Chemins de Fer de l'Ouest
29 April	Extremadura	Protected cruiser	Constructora Naval Española	Cádiz	Spanish Navy	For Spanish Navy
May	Torpilleur N° 252	37 metre type Normand (1899 tranche) torpedo boat	Ateliers et Chantiers de la Loire	Nantes	France	For the French Navy
1 May	Ville de Belfort	Sailing ship	Forges et Chantiers de la Méditerranée	Le Havre	France	For Compagnie des Voiliers Havrais
15 May	Thornton	Blakely-class torpedo boat	William R. Trigg Company	Richmond, Virginia	United States	
16 May	Aboukir	Cressy-class cruiser	Fairfield Shipbuilding and Engineering Company	Govan, Scotland	United Kingdom	
26 May	Myrmidon	Myrmidon-class destroyer	Palmers Shipbuilding and Iron Company	Jarrow, England	United Kingdom	
31 May	Ajax	Cargo Liner	Scotts Shipbuilding and Engineering Company	Greenock	United Kingdom	For Ocean Steamship Co.
31 May	Commonwealth	Passenger ship	Harland & Wolff	Belfast	United Kingdom	For Richard Mills & Co.
May	Sunshine	Ketch	C. Burt & Sons	Falmouth	United Kingdom	For Lewis Nurse.
27 June	Gloire	Gloire-class cruiser	Arsenal de Lorient	Lorient	France	For the French Navy
28 June	Espingole	Fauconneau-class destroyer	Chantiers et Ateliers Augustin Normand	Le Havre	France	For the French Navy
3 July	Thetis	Gazelle-class cruiser	Kaiserliche Werft Danzig	Danzig	Germany	
3 July	Wittelsbach	Wittelsbach-class battleship	Kaiserliche Werft Wilhelmshaven	Wilhelmshaven	Germany	
7 July	Minnehaha	Passenger ship	Harland & Wolff	Belfast	United Kingdom	For Atlantic Transport Co.
13 July	Hartburn	Steamship	Blyth Shipbuilding & Dry Docks Co. Ltd	Blyth	United Kingdom	For Tyne & Blyth Steamship Owning Co. Ltd.
14 July	Marsellaise	Gloire-class cruiser	Arsenal de Brest	Brest	France	For the French Navy
24 July	Dale	Bainbridge-class destroyer	William R. Trigg Company	Richmond, Virginia	United States	
27 July	Epée	Pique-class destroyer	Forges et Chantiers de la Méditerranée	Le Havre	France	For the French Navy
28 July	Barney	Bagley-class torpedo boat	Bath Iron Works	Bath, Maine	United States	
30 July	Trombe	Siroco-class torpedo boat	Ateliers et Chantiers de la Loire	Nantes	France	For the French Navy
August	Torpilleur N° 245	37 metre type Normand (1899 tranche) torpedo boat	Chantier Schneider	Chalon-sur-Saône	France	For the French Navy
10 August	Ariadne	Gazelle-class cruiser	Kaiserliche Werft Wilhelmshaven	Wilhelmshaven	Germany	
13 August	Hogue	Cressy-class cruiser	Vickers Limited	Barrow-in-Furness	United Kingdom	
28 August	Sirène	Sirène-class submarine	Arsenal de Cherbourg	Cherbourg	France	For French Navy
29 August	Audacieux	Siroco-class torpedo boat	Ateliers et Chantiers de la Loire	Nantes	France	For the French Navy
8 September	Kangaroo	Destroyer	Palmers Shipbuilding and Iron Company	Jarrow, England	United Kingdom	Later classified as part of B class
8 September	Wyoming	Monitor	Union Iron Works	San Francisco, California	United States	
9 September	Habsburg	Habsburg-class battleship	Stabilimento Tecnico Triestino	Trieste, Austria	Austria-Hungary	
20 September	Galician	Passenger ship	Harland & Wolff	Belfast	United Kingdom	For Union Steamship Co.
24 September	Cataluña	Princesa de Asturias-class armored cruiser	Arsenal de Cartagena	Cartagena	Spain	For Spanish Navy
24 September	O'Brien	Blakely-class torpedo boat	Lewis Nixon	Elizabeth, New Jersey	United States	
25 September	Bagley	Bagley-class torpedo boat	Bath Iron Works	Bath, Maine	United States	
26 September	Decatur	Bainbridge-class destroyer	William R. Trigg Company	Richmond, Virginia	United States	
August	Torpilleur N° 246	37 metre type Normand (1899 tranche) torpedo boat	Chantier Schneider	Chalon-sur-Saône	France	For the French Navy
6 October	Amazone	Gazelle-class cruiser	Germaniawerft	Kiel	Germany	
6 October	Greyhound	Greyhound-class destroyer	R. & L. Hawthorn, Leslie & Company	Hebburn-on-Tyne	United Kingdom	
10 October	Woodburn	Steamship	Blyth Shipbuilding & Dry Docks Co. Ltd	Blyth	United Kingdom	For Tye & Blyth Steamship Co. Ltd.
27 October	Perry	Bainbridge-class destroyer	Union Iron Works	San Francisco, California	United States	
7 November	Lawrence	Bainbridge-class destroyer	Fore River Ship and Engine Building Company	Weymouth, Massachusetts	United States	
8 November	Racehorse	Greyhound-class destroyer	R. & L. Hawthorn, Leslie & Company	Hebburn-on-Tyne	United Kingdom	
9 November	Hilda	Steamship	Blyth Shipbuilding & Dry Docks Co. Ltd	Blyth	United Kingdom	For W. B. Niven.
10 November	Arkansas	Monitor	Newport News Shipbuilding and Drydock Company	Newport News, Virginia	United States	
22 November	Blakely	Blakely-class torpedo boat	George Lawley & Sons	South Boston, Boston, Massachusetts	United States	
23 November	DeLong	Blakely-class torpedo boat	George Lawley & Sons	South Boston, Boston, Massachusetts	United States	
24 November	Nevada	Monitor	Bath Iron Works	Bath, Maine	United States	
August	Torpilleur N° 248	37 metre type Normand (1899 tranche) torpedo boat	Chantier Schneider	Chalon-sur-Saône	France	For the French Navy
5 December	Medusa	Gazelle-class cruiser	AG Weser	Bremen	Germany	
5 December	Pertuisane	Pertuisane-class destroyer	Arsenal de Rochefort	Rochefort	France	For the French Navy
6 December	Canterbury	Passenger ferry	W Denny & Bros	Dumbarton	United Kingdom	For South Eastern and Chatham Railway
8 December	Suevic	Passenger ship	Harland & Wolff	Belfast	United Kingdom	For White Star Line.
20 December	Escopette	Pertuisane-class destroyer	Arsenal de Rochefort	Rochefort	France	For the French Navy
22 December	Barotse	Cargo Ship	Sir James Laing & Sons Ltd.	Sunderland	United Kingdom	For Bucknall Steamship Lines Ltd.
24 December	Macdonough	Bainbridge-class destroyer	Fore River Ship and Engine Building Company	Weymouth, Massachusetts	United States	
25 December	Léopoldine	Wooden, three-masted schooner; 479 GRT	A Buron	Saint Malo	France	For: E Houduce
Unknown date	Abbey	Barge	Joseph Barnard	Gloucester	United Kingdom	For private owner.
Unknown date	Balmoral	Paddle steamer	McKnights.	Ayr	United Kingdom	For P. & A. Campbell.
Unknown date	Blossom	Steam drifter	Beeching Brothers Ltd.	Great Yarmouth	United Kingdom	For George Reid, W. Reid and others.
Unknown date	Boy Fred	Steam drifter	Beeching Brothers Ltd.	Great Yarmouth	United Kingdom	For William Holker.
Unknown date	Girl Daisy	Steam drifter	Beeching Brothers Ltd.	Great Yarmouth	United Kingdom	For Frederick J. W. Salmon and others.
Unknown date	Glen Rosa	Steam drifter	Beeching Brothers Ltd.	Great Yarmouth	United Kingdom	For John Johnson.
Unknown date	Killoran	Barque	Ailsa Shipbuilding Co Ltd.	Troon	United Kingdom	For J. Hardie.
Unknown date	Lily	Steam drifter	Beeching Brothers Ltd.	Great Yarmouth	United Kingdom	For Robert H. Brown and others.
Unknown date	Lord Roberts	Paddle tug	Allsup & Co. Ltd.	Preston	United Kingdom	For Great Yarmouth Steam Tug Co. Ltd.
Unknown date	Mafeking	Sloop	Brown & Clapson	Barton-upon-Humber	United Kingdom	For James Barraclough.
Unknown date	Mishie Nahma	Steam drifter	Beeching Brothers Ltd.	Great Yarmouth	United Kingdom	For William Crome Jr.
Unknown date	Petunia	Steam drifter	Beeching Brothers Ltd.	Great Yarmouth	United Kingdom	For Charles F. Johnson.
Unknown date	Pretoria	Steam drifter	John Bowden	Porthleven	United Kingdom	For private owner.
Unknown date	Viking	Steam drifter	Beeching Brothers Ltd.	Great Yarmouth	United Kingdom	For Pitchers Ltd.
Unknown date	Westmoreland	Thames barge	White	Conyer	United Kingdom	
