= USS Tingey (TB-34) =

Torpedo boat of the United States Navy

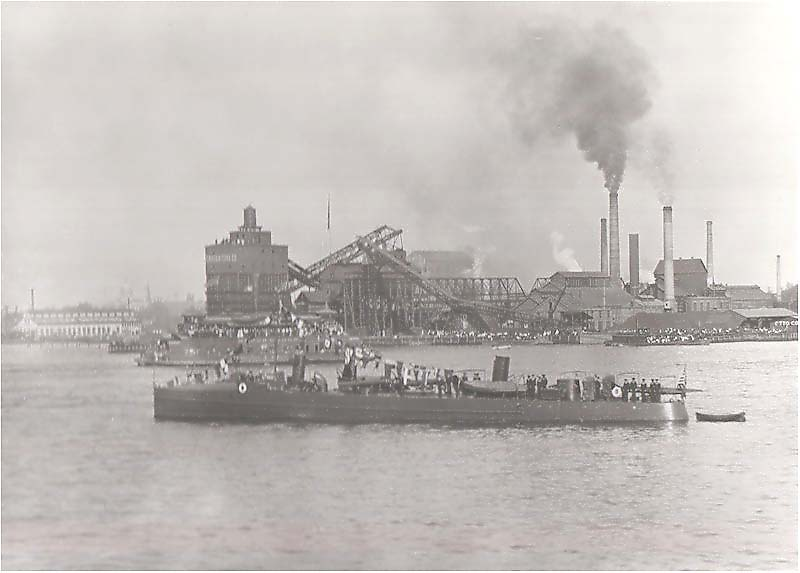
- USS Tingey (TB-34), off Kaign Avenue, Camden, NJ, 1908.

History

United States
- Name: Tingey
- Namesake: Commodore Thomas Tingey
- Builder: Columbian Iron Works, Baltimore, Maryland
- Laid down: 29 March 1899
- Launched: 26 March 1901
- Sponsored by: Miss Anna T. Craven, the great-great-granddaughter of Commodore Thomas Tingey
- Commissioned: 7 January 1904
- Decommissioned: 30 January 1919
- Renamed: Coast Torpedo Boat No. 17, 1 August 1918
- Stricken: 28 October 1919
- Fate: Sold, 10 March 1920, to the Independent Pier Co., of Philadelphia, Pa.

General characteristics
- Class & type: Blakely-class torpedo boat
- Displacement: 165 long tons (168 t)
- Length: 176 ft (54 m)
- Beam: 17 ft 6 in (5.33 m)
- Draft: 4 ft 8 in (1.42 m) (mean)
- Installed power: not known
- Propulsion: not known
- Speed: 24.94 kn (28.70 mph; 46.19 km/h); 24.88 kn (28.63 mph; 46.08 km/h) (Speed on Trial)
- Complement: 28 officers and enlisted
- Armament: 3 × 1-pounder, 3 × 18 inch (450 mm) torpedo tubes

USS Tingey (TB-34) was a Blakely-class torpedo boat of the United States Navy. She was the first of three ships to be named after Commodore Thomas Tingey.

The first Tingey (Torpedo Boat No. 34) was laid down on 29 March 1899 at Baltimore, Maryland, by the Columbian Iron Works, launched on 25 March 1901. This was sponsored by Miss Anna T. Craven, the great-great-granddaughter of Commodore Tingey, and commissioned at Norfolk, Virginia, on 7 January 1904.

== Service history ==
=== 1904–1916 ===
Tingey then joined the Reserve Torpedo Flotilla at its base at the Norfolk Navy Yard and remained there for the first third of her Navy career. For the most part, she lay tied up at pierside; but, periodically she got underway to ensure her material readiness should a need for her services ever arise. By 1908, she was reassigned to the 3rd Torpedo Flotilla, but she remained relatively inactive at Norfolk. In 1909, she was listed as a unit of the Atlantic Torpedo Fleet. However, all three organizations to which she was assigned appear simply to have been different names for the same duty – lying at pier side in reserve.

Sometime late in 1909, Tingey moved south from Norfolk to Charleston, South Carolina, where she was promptly placed in reserve again on 22 December 1909. The torpedo boat remained at Charleston, in various conditions of reserve, but apparently always still in commission. Infrequently, she got underway to test her machinery.

On 22 October 1911, Tingey left Charleston Harbor along with torpedo boats USS Craven, USS Barney, USS DeLong, USS Wilkes, and destroyer USS Macdonough for Hampton Roads, there to await orders before proceeding to New York to take part in a naval review. Fifteen miles off Charleston lighthouse, the tubes of boiler B blew out. The disabled Tingey was towed back to Charleston by the naval tug USS Sebago. John Henry Tibbs, a water tender, died the following day from injuries sustained in the explosion. Joseph S. Myers, a fireman, was seriously burned and scalded. There was hope he would survive his injuries but he also died.

=== 1917–1919 ===
In 1917, Tingey moved north to the Philadelphia Navy Yard where she was placed out of commission on 8 March 1917. A month later on 7 April 1917, she was recommissioned and moved further north to patrol the coastal waters of the 1st Naval District during the period the United States participated in World War I.

In September 1918, the torpedo boat's name was canceled so that it could be given to Destroyer No. 272, one of the new Clemson-class destroyers. The older vessel then became Coast Torpedo Boat No. 17. Two months later, Germany sued for the armistice which ended hostilities.

=== Decommissioning and sale ===
Coast Torpedo Boat No. 17 was placed out of commission at Philadelphia on 30 January 1919, and she was struck from the Navy List on 28 October 1919. On 10 March 1920, she was sold to the Independent Pier Co., of Philadelphia, Pennsylvania.

== Bibliography ==
- Eger, Christopher L. (March 2021). "Hudson Fulton Celebration, Part II". Warship International. LVIII (1): 58–81. ISSN 0043-0374.
