= USS Tingey =

USS Tingey may refer to:

- USS Tingey (TB-34), a Blakely-class torpedo boat, launched in 1901 and struck in 1919.
- USS Tingey (DD-272), a Clemson-class destroyer, launched in 1919 and struck in 1936.
- USS Tingey (DD-539), a Fletcher-class destroyer, launched in 1943 and struck in 1965.
