= James O. Richardson =

United States Navy Admiral and author

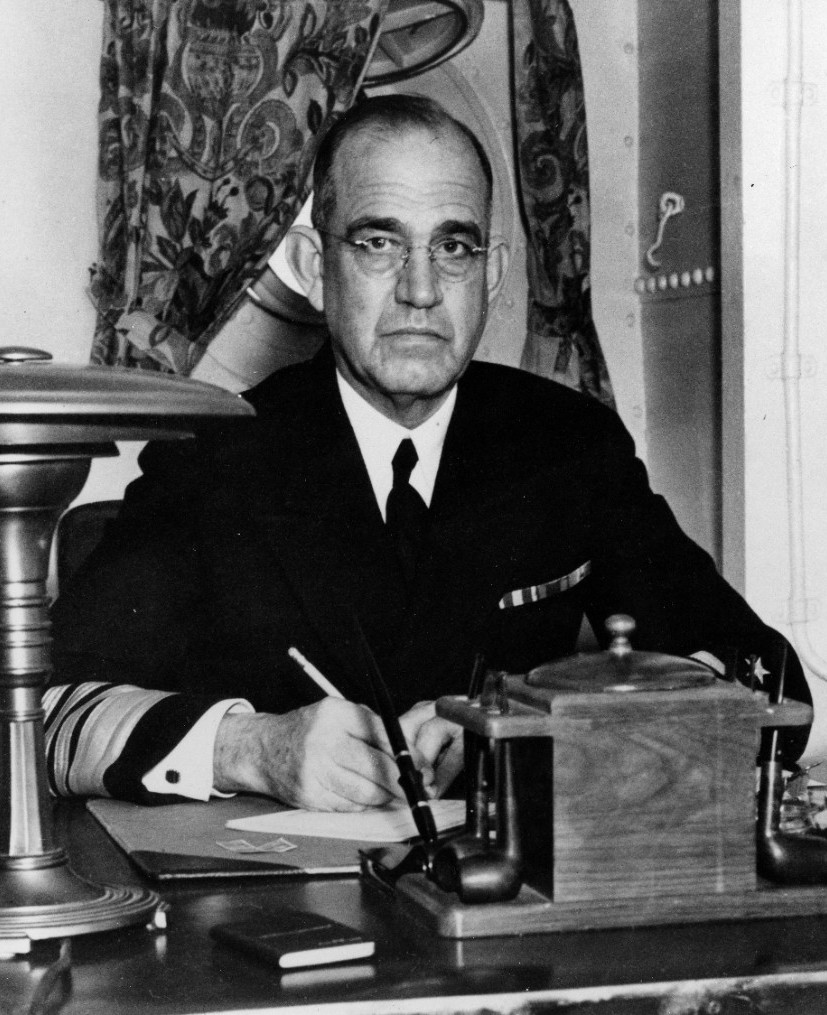
- Admiral Richardson as Commander, Battle Force, U.S. Fleet, 1939
- Born: James Otto Richardson; 18 September 1878; Paris, Texas, U.S.
- Died: 2 May 1974 (aged 95); Bethesda, Maryland, U.S.
- Military career
- Allegiance: United States of America
- Branch: United States Navy
- Service years: 1902–1947
- Rank: Admiral
- Conflicts: Philippine-American War; World War I World War II

James Otto Richardson (18 September 1878 – 2 May 1974) was an admiral in the United States Navy who served from 1902 to 1947.

As commander in chief of the United States Fleet (CinCUS), Richardson protested the redeployment of the Pacific portion of the fleet to Pearl Harbor. He believed that a forward defense was neither practical nor useful, and that the Pacific Fleet would be a logical first target in the event of war with Japan. He was relieved of command in February 1941. His concerns proved justified during the Japanese attack on Pearl Harbor, only ten months later.

== Early life and career ==
Richardson was born in Paris, Texas. He entered the United States Naval Academy in 1898 and graduated fifth in a class of eighty-five in 1902. His first duty assignments were in the Asiatic Squadron, where he took part in the Philippine campaign and, after 1905, in the Atlantic Ocean. In 1907 to 1909, Lieutenant Richardson commanded the torpedo boats Tingey and Stockton and the Third Division, Atlantic Torpedo Flotilla. He was a member of the first class of the Navy's Post Graduate Engineering School in 1909– to 1911 and served as an engineer on the battleship USS Delaware and on the staff of the Atlantic Reserve Fleet. In 1914, Richardson was promoted to the rank of Lieutenant Commander and was attached to the Department of the Navy's Bureau of Steam Engineering, where he worked to assure the Navy's fuel supply.

== World War I and interwar years ==
From 1917 to 1919, Commander Richardson was navigator and executive officer of the battleship USS Nevada. Following a tour at the Naval Academy, he was given command of the gunboat USS Asheville in 1922 and took her out to Asiatic waters, where he also had command of the South China Patrol. Captain Richardson was Assistant to the Chief, Bureau of Ordnance, in 1924 to 1927. In the late 1920s, he commanded a destroyer division and returned to the US for service with the Bureau of Navigation (BuNav).

In January 1931, Captain Richardson placed the new heavy cruiser USS Augusta in commission and commanded her for more than two years. After a tour as a Naval War College student in 1933–1934, he was Budget Officer at the Navy Department, receiving promotion to rear admiral while he was in that position in December 1934. His early duties as a flag officer included command of a Scouting Force cruiser division, service as aide and Chief of Staff to Admiral J.M. "Bull" Reeves, and a tour as Commander Destroyers, Scouting Force. He became Assistant CNO to Admiral William D. Leahy in June 1937, handling the Washington end of the search for Amelia Earhart and the attack on the USS Panay. A year later, he became chief of the Bureau of Navigation. In early 1938, he assisted Army Major General Stanley Embick with the compilation of more current military plans for a war against Japan, then called War Plan Orange. In June 1939, Richardson went back to sea as Commander, Battle Force (ComBatFor), U.S. Fleet, with the temporary rank of admiral.

== Pearl Harbor and aftermath ==
Beginning in January 1940, Richardson was Commander in Chief, United States Fleet (CinCUS), which was command of both the Scouting Force (Atlantic Fleet) and Battle Force (Pacific Fleet). At the time of his appointment, Richardson was particularly suited for the post:

[Richardson] was one of the Navy's foremost figures. Since his earliest days, after leaving Annapolis, he had made the study of Japanese warfare his life's work. He was beyond question the Navy's outstanding authority on Pacific naval warfare and Japanese strategy.

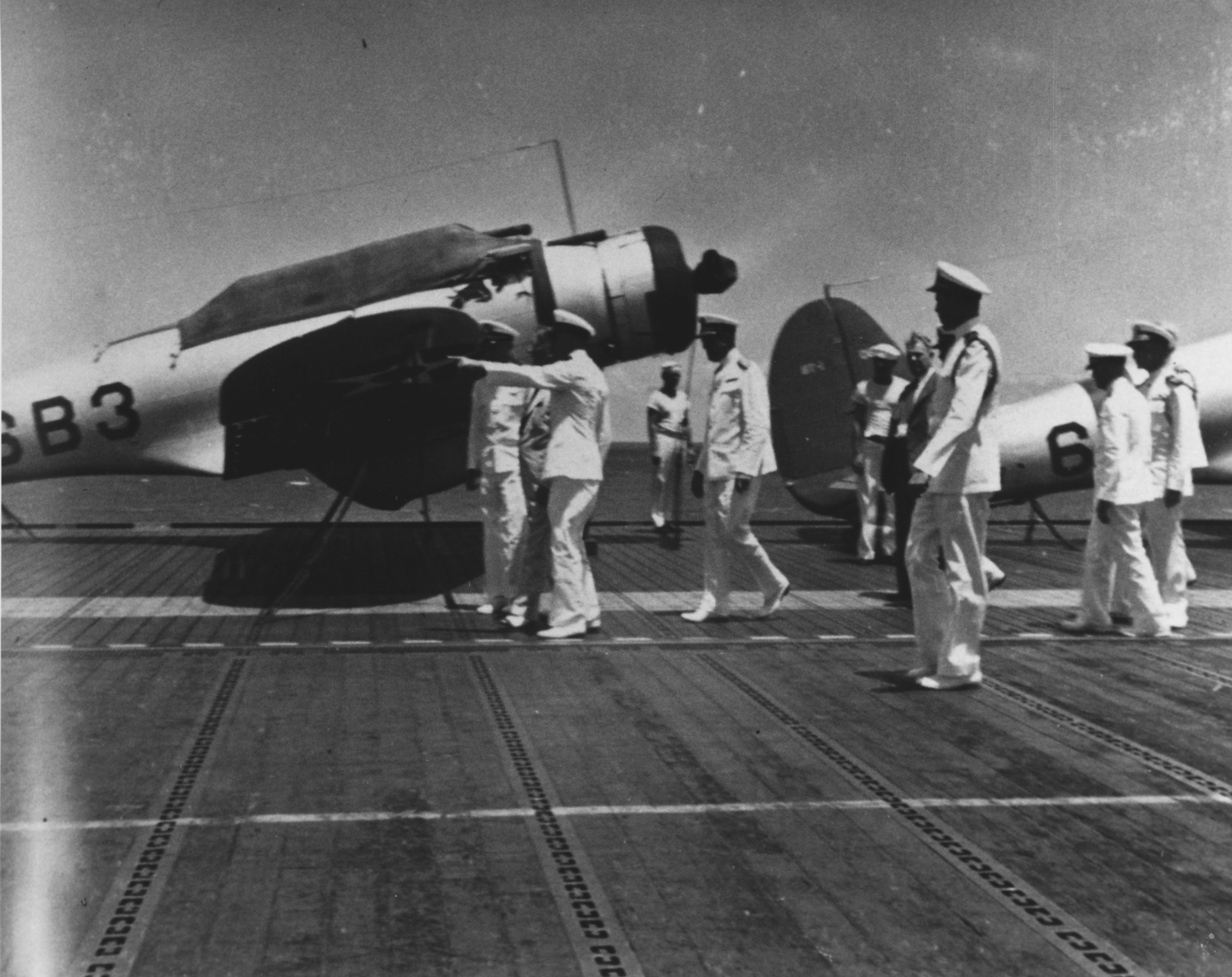
Secretary of the Navy Frank Knox on USS Enterprise (CV-6) with Richardson following him (center) in 1940

Richardson held the position during a stressful period marked by presidential orders to deploy the Pacific part of the fleet to Pearl Harbor from its traditional naval base in San Diego, California. He noted:

In 1940, the policy-making branch of the Government in foreign affairs − the President and the Secretary of State − thought that stationing the Fleet in Hawaii would restrain the Japanese. They did not ask their senior military advisors whether it would accomplish such an end.

Richardson protested this redeployment to President Franklin D. Roosevelt and to others in Washington. He believed that advanced bases like Guam and Hawaii were necessary, but that insufficient funding and efforts had been made to prepare them for use in wartime. He also believed future battles in the Pacific would involve aircraft carriers, and more scouting forces would be needed to locate them. Additionally, Richardson argued that morale would suffer due to there being "too few white women; shopkeepers gypped the sailors." Richardson recognized how vulnerable the fleet would be in such an exposed and remote position, a logistical nightmare that was only worsened by the slim resources and the lack of preparation and organization. Richardson argued such a forward defense was not practical or useful, despite Japan's attack on China and whatever promises had been made to the United Kingdom to come to its aid if attacked. Richardson wanted to return to the West Coast, prepare the fleet, and then perhaps return to Pearl Harbor:

Richardson twice traveled to Washington to meet with Roosevelt to discuss the issue. He followed that up with an official letter to the Chief of Naval Operations (CNO), Admiral Harold R. Stark, pointing out his own firm conviction that neither the Navy nor the country was prepared for war with Japan. After his early October visit to Roosevelt, on October 26, 1940, a White House leak to the Washington-based Kiplinger Newsletter predicted that Richardson would be removed as fleet commander. During that October visit with FDR, Richardson told the President his belief that “the senior officers of the Navy do not have the trust and confidence in the civilian leadership of this country that is essential for the successful prosecution of a war in the Pacific." Most believed he might be promoted upwards to replace Stark as CNO, but, instead he was fired. On 1 February 1941, General Order 143 reorganized the United States Fleet. In its place, the U.S. Atlantic Fleet and the U.S. Pacific Fleet were re-established, each under its own commander in chief. The same day, Richardson was replaced by Admiral Husband Kimmel as the new Commander in Chief Pacific Fleet (CinCPac) and as CinCUS in case the two ocean fleets merged. Admiral Ernest King became Commander in Chief, Atlantic Fleet (CinCLant) on the same day and later CinCUS in December 1941 after the attack on Pearl Harbor.

Upon his relief by Roosevelt, "Richardson reverted to his permanent rank of rear admiral and served as a member of the Navy General Board, and in the office of the Secretary of the Navy until his retirement on October 1, 1942."

Transferred to the retired list with the rank of admiral in October 1942, he remained on active service with the Navy Relief Society, as senior member of a "Special Joint Chiefs of Staff Committee" on the reorganization of the national defense, as one of the first called before the Congressional Committee on Pearl Harbor and as a witness before the International Military Tribunal for the Far East. Released from active duty in January 1947, he thereafter resided in Washington, D.C.

He and his friend, Admiral George C. Dyer, later produced a book, On the Treadmill to Pearl Harbor.

Richardson died on 2 May 1974 at his home in Washington, DC.

== Awards and decorations ==
Richardson's decorations include: Navy Spanish Campaign Medal, Philippine Campaign Medal, World War I Victory Medal, American Defense Service Medal, American Campaign Medal, World War II Victory Medal.

== See also ==
- Events leading to the attack on Pearl Harbor
- Attack on Pearl Harbor

== Bibliography ==
- On the Treadmill to Pearl Harbor, The Memoirs of Admiral J. O. Richardson; As told to George C. Dyer, Vice Admiral, USN (RET); Naval History Division, Department of the Navy, Washington, DC; 1973; Library of Congress Catalog Card No. 73–600198
- Pearl Harbor Countdown: The Biography of Admiral James O. Richardson by Skipper Steely, published by Pelican Press, Gretna, Louisiana, 2008.

Military offices
Preceded by Claude C. Bloch	Commander in Chief of the United States Fleet; 1940–1941	Succeeded by Husband E. Kimmel
