= Dudley Wright Knox =

American naval officer

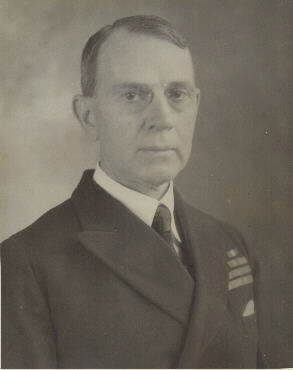
- Born: June 21, 1877; Fort Walla Walla, Washington, U.S.
- Died: June 11, 1960 (aged 82); Bethesda, Maryland, U.S.
- Burial place: Arlington National Cemetery
- Military career
- Allegiance: United States of America
- Branch: United States Navy
- Service years: 1896–1946
- Rank: Commodore
- Conflicts: Spanish–American War; Boxer Rebellion; World War I World War II
- Awards: Navy Cross; Legion of Merit

Commodore Dudley Wright Knox (21 June 1877 – 11 June 1960) was an officer in the United States Navy during the Spanish–American War and World War I. He was also a prominent naval historian, who for many years oversaw the Navy Department's historical office, now named the Naval History and Heritage Command.

== Early life ==
Born in Fort Walla Walla, Washington, Knox attended school in Washington, D.C., and graduated from the United States Naval Academy on 5 June 1896.

== Professional career ==
During the Spanish–American War he served aboard the screw steamer Maple, a tender, in Cuban waters. He commanded the gunboats Albay and Iris during the Philippine–American War of 1899-1902 and the latter during the Chinese Boxer Rebellion of 1899-1901. He then commanded three of the Navy's first destroyers: Shubrick, Wilkes and Decatur, before commanding the First Torpedo Flotilla. During the 1907-1909 cruise of the "Great White Fleet", sent around the world by President Theodore Roosevelt, he served as ordnance officer of the battleship Nebraska (BB-14).

On May 18, 1908, while the Great White Fleet rested in San Francisco, California, he married Lily Hazard McCalla (1878–1965), the daughter of Rear Admiral Bowman H. McCalla. They had one son, Dudley Sargent Knox, (1909-1968). Lily's brother-in-law, Arthur MacArthur III, was Dudley's classmate at the Naval Academy.

He attended the Naval War College's two-year course in 1912–13, and after graduation became the aide to Captain William Sims, commanding the Atlantic Torpedo Flotilla. In 1915 Knox became a leading figure in developing naval operational doctrine by publishing an influential article in the U.S. Naval Institute Proceedings. He served as Fleet Ordnance Officer in both Atlantic and Pacific, served in the Office of Naval Intelligence, and commanded the Guantanamo Bay Naval Station. In November 1917 he joined the staff of Admiral William Sims, Commander of U.S. Naval Forces in European Waters, and earned the Navy Cross for "distinguished service" serving as Aide in the Planning Section, and later in the Historical Section. He was promoted to Captain on 1 February 1918.

After returning to the United States in March 1919, he served for a year on the faculty of the Naval War College, when he became a key figure on the Knox-King-Pye Board that examined professional military education. In 1920–21 he commanded the armored cruiser Brooklyn (ACR-3), then the protected cruiser Charleston (C-22) before resuming duty in the Office of the Chief of Naval Operations.

In 1920 Knox first began his work as a naval publicist, serving as naval editor of the Army and Navy Journal until 1923. He became the naval correspondent of The Baltimore Sun from 1924 to 1946, and naval correspondent of the New York Herald Tribune in 1929. Transferred to the Retired List of the Navy on 20 October 1921, he continued on active duty, simultaneously serving as Officer in Charge, Office of Naval Records and Library, and as Curator for the Navy Department. Knox played a key role in setting up the Naval Historical Foundation. Early in World War II he was assigned additional duty as Deputy Director of Naval History.

For a quarter of a century his leadership inspired diligence, efficiency, and initiative while he guided, improved, and expanded the Navy's archival and historical operations. His personal connections to President Roosevelt, Fleet Admiral Ernest J. King, and other senior leaders in the Navy Department allowed him to play an instrumental role behind the scenes in the years leading up to and during World War II.

His writings included his first book The Eclipse of American Sea Power (1922) and A History of the United States Navy (1936), the latter recognized as "the best one-volume history of the United States Navy in existence". Through his personal connection with President Roosevelt, he was able to publish key, multi-volume collections of documents on naval operations in The Quasi-War with France in 1798–1800, the First Barbary War and the Second Barbary War.

Advanced to Commodore on 2 November 1945, he was awarded the Legion of Merit for "exceptionally meritorious conduct" while directing the correlation and preservation of accurate records of the U.S. naval operations in World War II, thus protecting this vital information for posterity.

Knox was relieved of all active duty 26 June 1946. He died in Bethesda, Maryland, on 11 June 1960. His papers in 24 boxes are in the Manuscript Division of the Library of Congress.

The United States Navy ship USS Knox (FF-1052) was named for him, as is the Naval Historical Foundation's Commodore Dudley W. Knox Naval History Lifetime Achievement Award. The library at the Naval Postgraduate School in Monterey, California is also named for him.

== Published works ==
- Report and Recommendations of a Board Appointed by the Bureau of Navigation Regarding the Instruction and Training of Line Officers, by Dudley W. Knox, Ernest J. King, and William S. Pye. (1920)
- The Eclipse of American Sea Power (1922)
- The Naval Genius of George Washington with a foreword by Admiral Hilary P. Jones. (1932)
- Naval Documents Related to the Quasi-War between the United States and France, 1798–1800 Seven volumes. Published under direction of the Secretary of the Navy. Prepared by the Office of Naval Records and Library, Navy Department, under the supervision of Captain Dudley W. Knox, U.S. Navy (ret.), with an introduction by President Franklin D. Roosevelt. (1935–1939)
- A History of the United States Navy, with an introduction by William L. Rodgers (1936); revised with a foreword by Chester W. Nimitz (1948, 2006)
- Naval Documents Related to the United States Wars with the Barbary Powers Six volumes. Published under direction of the Secretary of the Navy. Prepared by the Office of Naval Records and Library, Navy Department, under the supervision of Captain Dudley W. Knox, U.S. Navy (ret.). (1939–1944)
- Naval sketches of the war in California; reproducing twenty-eight drawings made in 1846–47, by William H. Meyers; descriptive text by Capt. Dudley W. Knox; introduction by Franklin D. Roosevelt (1939)
- Carte de la partie de la Virginie où l'armée combinée de France & des Etats-Unis de l'Amérique a fait prisonnière l'Armée anglaise, commandée par Lord Cornwallis le 19 octbre. 1781: avec le plan de l'attaque d'York-town & de Glocester, levée et dessinée sur les lieux par ordre des officiers genx. de l'Armée française & américaine / à Paris, ches Esnauts et Rapilly. (1945)
- Dudley Wright Knox: A Register of his Papers in the Library of Congress (1971)

== Decorations ==
Commodore Dudley Wright Knox's ribbon bar:

1st Row	Navy Cross		Legion of Merit
2nd Row	Navy Expeditionary Medal	Philippine Campaign Medal	Spanish Campaign Medal
3rd Row	China Relief Expedition Medal	Cuban Pacification Medal	Mexican Service Medal
4th Row	World War I Victory Medal w/ Overseas Clasp	American Defense Service Medal	American Campaign Medal
5th Row	World War II Victory Medal	Companion of the Order of St Michael and St George	Officer of the Order of Saints Maurice and Lazarus
