= USS Craven (TB-10) =

Torpedo boat of the United States Navy

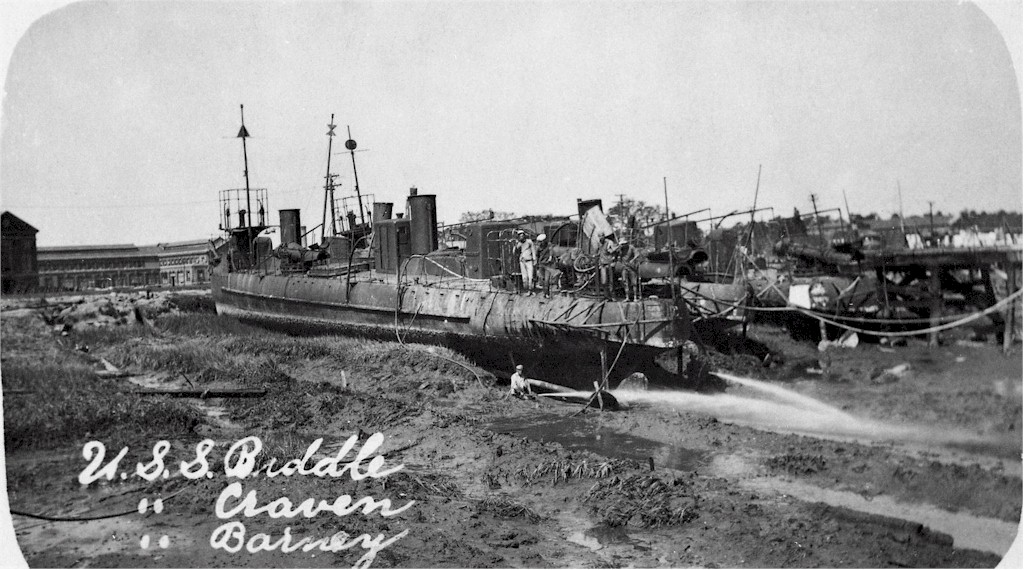
- USS Craven (TB-10), Biddle and Barney washed ashore at Charleston Navy Yard by a hurricane on 28 August 1911.

History

United States
- Namesake: Commander Tunis Craven
- Ordered: 10 June 1896 (authorized)
- Builder: Bath Iron Works, Bath, ME
- Laid down: 6 December 1897
- Launched: 25 September 1899
- Sponsored by: Miss A. Craven, granddaughter of Commander Craven
- Commissioned: 9 June 1900
- Decommissioned: 14 November 1913
- Identification: TB-10
- Fate: Used as target

General characteristics
- Class & type: Dahlgren-class torpedo boat
- Displacement: 146 long tons (148 t)
- Length: 151 ft 4 in (46.13 m)
- Beam: 16 ft 5 in (5.00 m)
- Draft: 4 ft 7 in (1.40 m) (mean)
- Installed power: 2 × Normand boilers; 4,200 ihp (3,132 kW)
- Propulsion: vertical triple expansion engines; 2 × screw propellers
- Speed: 31 knots (57 km/h; 36 mph); 30 kn (35 mph; 56 km/h) (Speed on Trial)
- Complement: 29 officers and enlisted
- Armament: 4 × 1-pounder (37 mm (1.46 in)) guns; 2 × 18 inch (450 mm) torpedo tubes (2x1)

The first USS Craven (Torpedo Boat Destroyer No. 10/TB-10), was launched 25 September 1899 by Bath Iron Works, Bath, Maine; sponsored by Miss A. Craven, granddaughter of Commander Craven; and commissioned 9 June 1900.

Sailing from Portsmouth Navy Yard 19 June 1900, Craven reported to the Naval Torpedo Station at Newport 21 June and served there until 2 December when she returned to Portsmouth. She was placed out of commission there 5 December 1900.

Recommissioned 24 October 1902, Craven served at the Torpedo Station at Newport until 12 December 1903 when she sailed to New York Navy Yard. She was placed out of commission again 22 December 1903. Except for service with the Torpedo Station in 1906 and 1907, she remained out of commission until 14 December 1907 when she was assigned to the Reserve Torpedo Flotilla at Norfolk Navy Yard. In 1908 she was transferred to Charleston, South Carolina, where she was decommissioned 14 November 1913 and used as a target.
