= USS Thornton (TB-33) =

Torpedo boat of the United States Navy

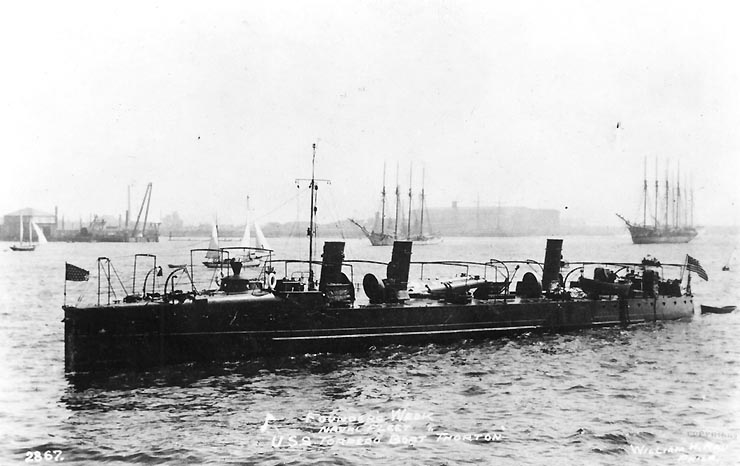
- USS Thornton (TB-33), off Philadelphia, Pennsylvania, during Founder's Week, 1908. Note the ketch under sail and several four-masted schooners in the background.

History

United States
- Name: Thornton
- Namesake: James S. Thornton
- Builder: William R. Trigg Company, Richmond, Virginia
- Laid down: 16 March 1899
- Launched: 15 May 1900
- Sponsored by: Miss Mary Thornton Davis
- Commissioned: 9 June 1902
- Decommissioned: 11 May 1918
- Renamed: Coast Torpedo Boat No. 16, 1 August 1918
- Stricken: 12 May 1919
- Fate: Sold to the Southern Oil & Transport Corp, August 1920

General characteristics
- Class & type: Blakely-class torpedo boat
- Displacement: 200 long tons (200 t)
- Length: 175 ft (53 m)
- Beam: 17 ft 6 in (5.33 m)
- Draft: 5 ft 2 in (1.57 m) (mean)
- Installed power: not known
- Propulsion: not known
- Speed: 25 kn (29 mph; 46 km/h); 24.88 kn (28.63 mph; 46.08 km/h) (Speed on Trial)
- Complement: 28 officers and enlisted
- Armament: 3 × 1-pounder, 3 × 18 inch (450 mm) torpedo tubes

The first Thornton (Torpedo Boat No. 33) was laid down on 16 March 1899 at Richmond, Va., by the William R. Trigg Co.; launched on 15 May 1900; sponsored by Miss Mary Thornton Davis; and commissioned on 9 June 1902.

Thornton participated in the summer maneuvers of the North Atlantic Fleet off the eastern coast of the United States. In November and December, the torpedo boat moved south to the West Indies for combined winter maneuvers. On 28 January 1903, she returned to Norfolk, and she was assigned to the Reserve Torpedo Flotilla on 16 February.

On 19 June 1905, Thornton was placed back in full commission; and, the following month, she made a brief visit to Annapolis, Md. On 21 July, she was again decommissioned and entered the Norfolk Navy Yard. Three months later, the torpedo boat rejoined the Reserve Torpedo Flotilla at Norfolk. Recommissioned on 19 June 1907, she was assigned to the 3d Torpedo Flotilla; and, over the next several years, she operated along the eastern seaboard and cruised the Gulf of Mexico. In the fall of 1909, she joined several other torpedo boats in ascending the Mississippi River as far as St. Louis. The following December, she entered Charleston, S.C., and, on the 22d, was decommissioned and assigned to the Reserve Torpedo Flotilla at Charleston.

Though the Reserve Torpedo Flotilla was abolished in 1914, Thornton remained inactive at Charleston until 1917, she was in reserve until 14 March 1914 when the Reserve Torpedo Flotilla was disbanded. After that, she was placed in commission, in ordinary, at the Charleston Navy Yard until 1917.

With America's entry into World War I, Thornton was placed back in full commission on 7 April 1917. She was converted to a minesweeper and, on 22 May, departed Charleston for Norfolk. Attached to the 5th Naval District, she performed minesweeping operations in Hampton Roads and off Cape Henry. On 8 April she collided with USS Joseph F. Bellows (SP-323) in Hampton Roads. Because of extensive damage, Thornton was towed to the Norfolk Navy Yard where she was decommissioned on 11 May 1918. On 1 August 1918, she was redesignated Coastal Torpedo Vessel No. 16 A board of inspection and survey examined her in March 1919 and recommended that she be sold. On 12 May her name was struck from the Navy list. Fifteen months later, near the end of August 1920, she was sold to the Southern Oil & Transport Corp., of New York City.

== Bibliography ==
- Eger, Christopher L. (March 2021). "Hudson Fulton Celebration, Part II". Warship International. LVIII (1): 58–81. ISSN 0043-0374.
