= USS Stockton (TB-32) =

Torpedo boat of the United States Navy

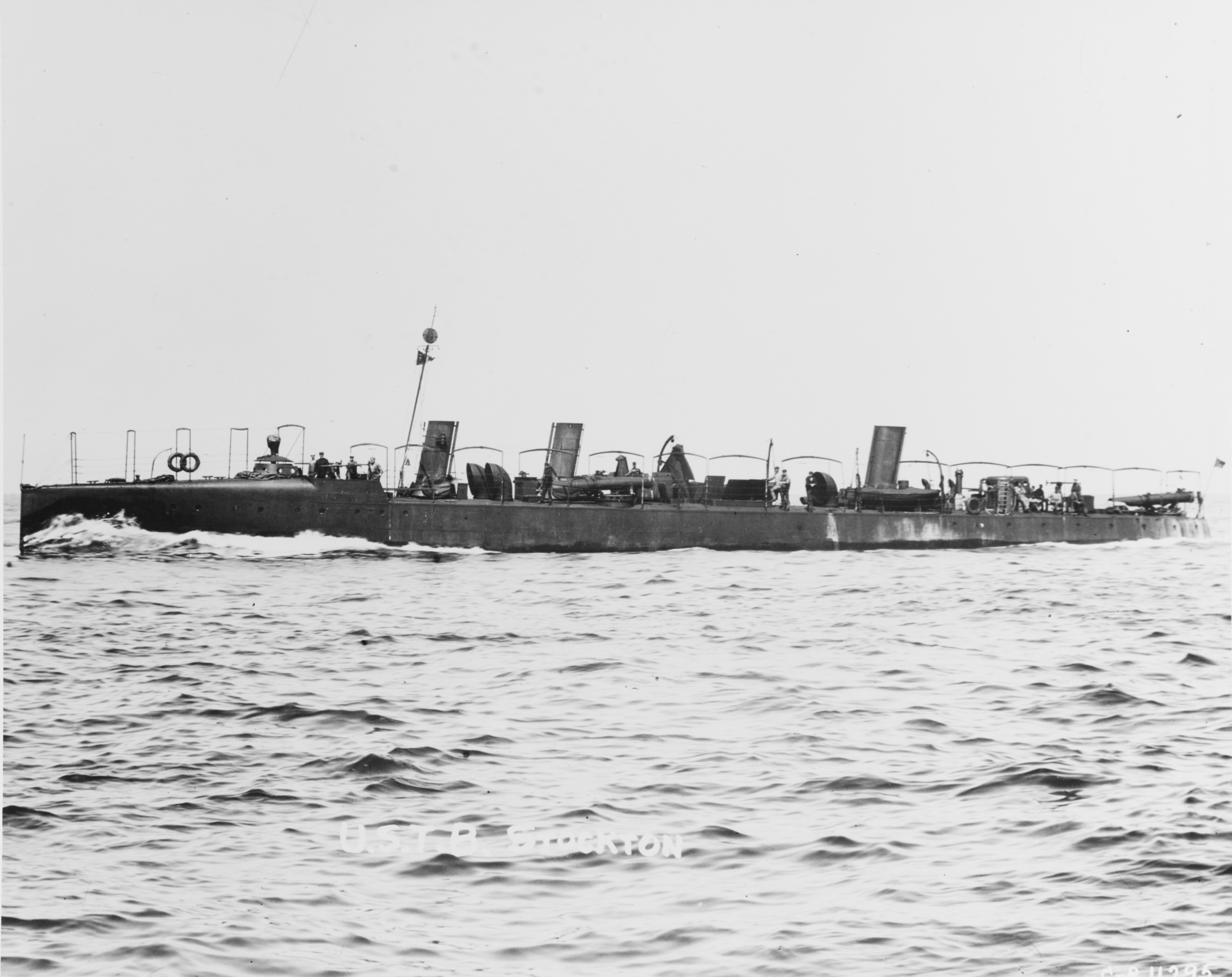
- USS Stockton (TB-32), underway during the early 1900s. Note the round identification shape carried on her foremast.

History

United States
- Name: Stockton
- Namesake: Commodore Robert F. Stockton
- Builder: William R. Trigg Company, Richmond, Virginia
- Launched: 27 December 1899
- Sponsored by: Miss Katherine Stockton
- Commissioned: 14 March 1901
- Decommissioned: 14 November 1913
- Stricken: 15 November 1913
- Fate: Sunk by battleships and destroyers of the Atlantic Fleet during September 1916

General characteristics
- Class & type: Blakely-class torpedo boat
- Displacement: 200 long tons (200 t)
- Length: 175 ft (53 m)
- Beam: 17 ft 8 in (5.38 m)
- Draft: 5 ft 2 in (1.57 m) (mean)
- Installed power: not known
- Propulsion: not known
- Speed: 25 kn (29 mph; 46 km/h); 25.79 kn (29.68 mph; 47.76 km/h) (Speed on Trial)
- Complement: 29 officers and enlisted
- Armament: 3 × 1-pounder, 3 × 18 inch (450 mm) torpedo tubes

The first Stockton was launched on 27 December 1899 by William R. Trigg Company, Richmond, Va.; sponsored by Miss Katherine Stockton; and commissioned on 14 March 1901.

Stockton remained at Norfolk Navy Yard until 14 November 1901 when she sailed for Port Royal, S.C. Decommissioned on 16 November, she remained there into the following year. Recommissioned on 7 June 1902, Stockton steamed, via New London, Conn., to Newport, R.I. On 25 August, the torpedo boat was ordered to the Caribbean. Arriving at Key West, Fla., on 3 October 1902, Stockton subsequently cruised off Hispaniola and Puerto Rico before returning to Key West on 14 January 1903. She reached Norfolk a fortnight later and was decommissioned there on 16 February.

Stockton was recommissioned on 11 June 1906 and assigned to the 3d Torpedo Flotilla the following day. She remained on the United States east coast into 1909, attached to the 3d Torpedo Flotilla. Transferred to the 1st Torpedo Division on 9 September 1909, she participated in the Hudson–Fulton Celebration during October 1909.

Stockton was placed in reserve on 9 November 1909 and, but for occasional cruises as far north as New York City, remained at Charleston Navy Yard into 1913. Decommissioned at Charleston Navy Yard on 14 November 1913, Stockton was struck from the Navy list on 15 November. On 25 May 1914, the torpedo boat was ordered prepared for use as a target and was sunk by battleships and destroyers of the Atlantic Fleet during September 1916.

== Bibliography ==
- Eger, Christopher L. (March 2021). "Hudson Fulton Celebration, Part II". Warship International. LVIII (1): 58–81. ISSN 0043-0374.
- Sieche, Erwin F. (1990). "Austria-Hungary's Last Visit to the USA". Warship International. XXVII (2): 142–164. ISSN 0043-0374.
