= USS Shubrick (TB-31) =

Torpedo boat of the United States Navy

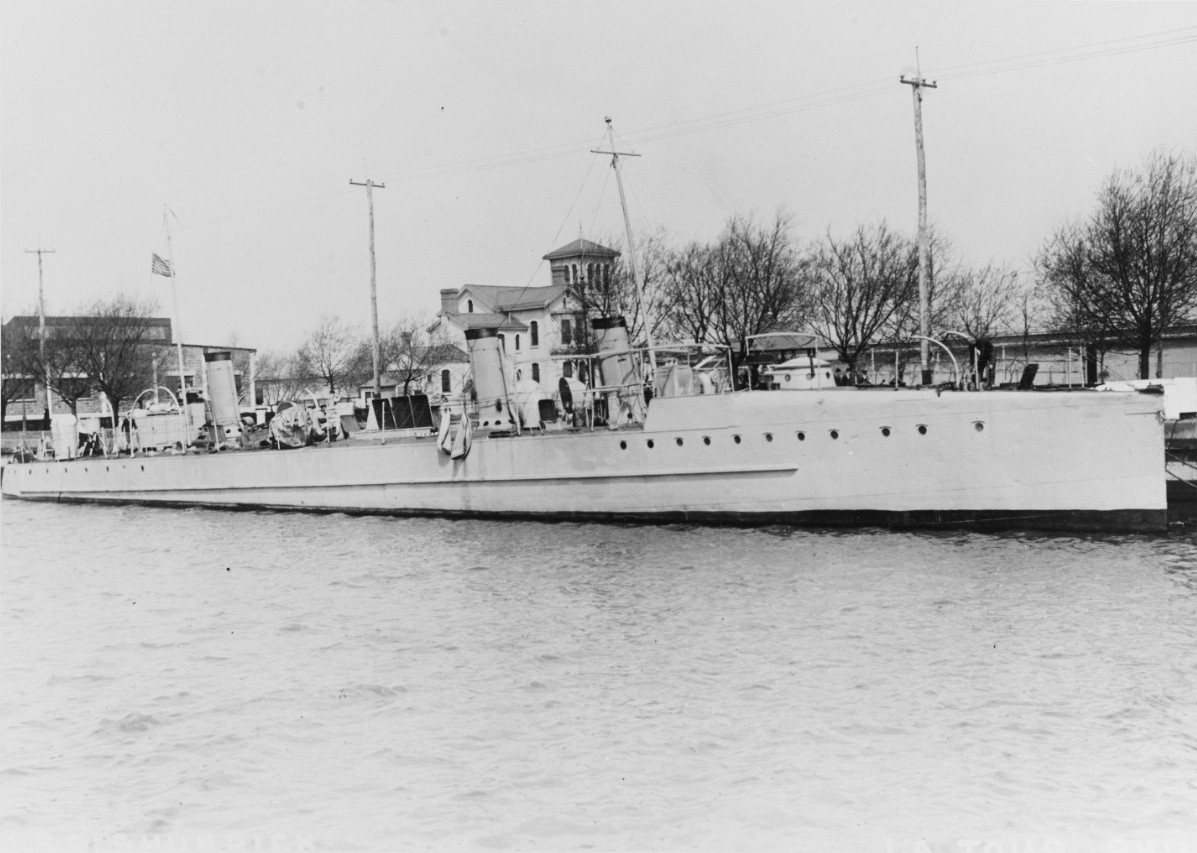
- USS Shubrick (TB-31), at Philadelphia Navy Yard, about 1919.

History

United States
- Namesake: William Shubrick
- Builder: William R. Trigg Company, Richmond, Virginia
- Laid down: 11 March 1899
- Launched: 31 October 1899
- Sponsored by: Miss Caroline Shubrick
- Commissioned: 1901
- Decommissioned: 23 April 1919
- Renamed: Coast Torpedo Boat No. 15, 1 August 1918
- Stricken: 28 October 1919
- Fate: Sold for scrap 10 March 1920

General characteristics
- Class & type: Blakely-class torpedo boat
- Displacement: 200 long tons (200 t)
- Length: 175 ft (53 m)
- Beam: 17 ft 8 in (5.38 m)
- Draft: 5 ft 2 in (1.57 m) (mean)
- Installed power: not known
- Propulsion: not known
- Speed: 25 kn (29 mph; 46 km/h); 26.07 kn (30.00 mph; 48.28 km/h) (Speed on Trial)
- Complement: 29 officers and enlisted
- Armament: 3 × 1-pounder; 3 × 18-inch (450 mm) torpedo tubes

USS Shubrick (TB-31) was laid down on 11 March 1899 by William R. Trigg Co., Richmond, Virginia; launched on 31 October 1899;it was named for William Branford Shubrick and sponsored by Miss Caroline Shubrick; and commissioned during 1901.

Following sea trials, Shubrick proceeded to Port Royal, South Carolina, where she was placed in reserve on 21 November 1901. Six months later, she rejoined the active fleet and, on 7 June 1902, sailed north. She arrived at the Torpedo Station, Newport, Rhode Island, on 18 July 1902; served briefly with the North Atlantic Squadron; then returned to Norfolk where she was decommissioned on 29 November.

Recommissioned, in reserve, on 8 April 1904, Shubrick was assigned to the Reserve Torpedo Flotilla at Norfolk Navy Yard. She was placed in full commission on 8 July 1905 at Norfolk but was decommissioned on 21 July. She was commissioned in reserve on 25 September 1905 and again assigned to the Reserve Torpedo Flotilla at Norfolk. Transferred to the 3d Torpedo Flotilla on 30 May 1907, she cruised off the northeast coast through the summer. On 11 November, she was detached from the North Atlantic Squadron, but continued to operate out of Norfolk until involved in a collision off (either Newport, Rhode Island or west of the Thimble Shoal Light off Hampton Roads), on 22 November 1907 with steamer Maryland in fog. Maryland sustained $1,000 in damage. After repairs, Shubrick rejoined the Reserve Torpedo Flotilla and, for over a year, remained inactive at Newport.

Activated in February 1909, Shubrick was recommissioned on 14 May 1909. She joined the 1st Torpedo Flotilla, Atlantic Fleet, on 28 May 1909. During October, she participated in celebrations commemorating the Hudson-Fulton Centenary, then returned to Charleston, South Carolina, where she was decommissioned on 30 November 1909.

Shubrick remained in reserve into 1917, assigned to the Reserve Torpedo Flotilla at Charleston Naval Shipyard. On 1 April 1917, she was recommissioned and, during World War I, served on local patrol duty in the Charleston area.

On 1 August 1918, Shubrick was renamed Coast Torpedo Boat No. 15 to allow her name to be given to a new destroyer, then under construction. Largely inactive after being renamed, she was decommissioned on 23 April 1919, and her name was struck from the Navy list on 28 October. Coast Torpedo Boat No. 15 was sold for scrapping on 10 March 1920 to the U.S. Rail and Salvage Co. of Newburgh, New York.

== Bibliography ==
- Eger, Christopher L. (March 2021). "Hudson Fulton Celebration, Part II". Warship International. LVIII (1): 58–81. ISSN 0043-0374.
