= USS Decatur (DD-5) =

Bainbridge-class destroyer

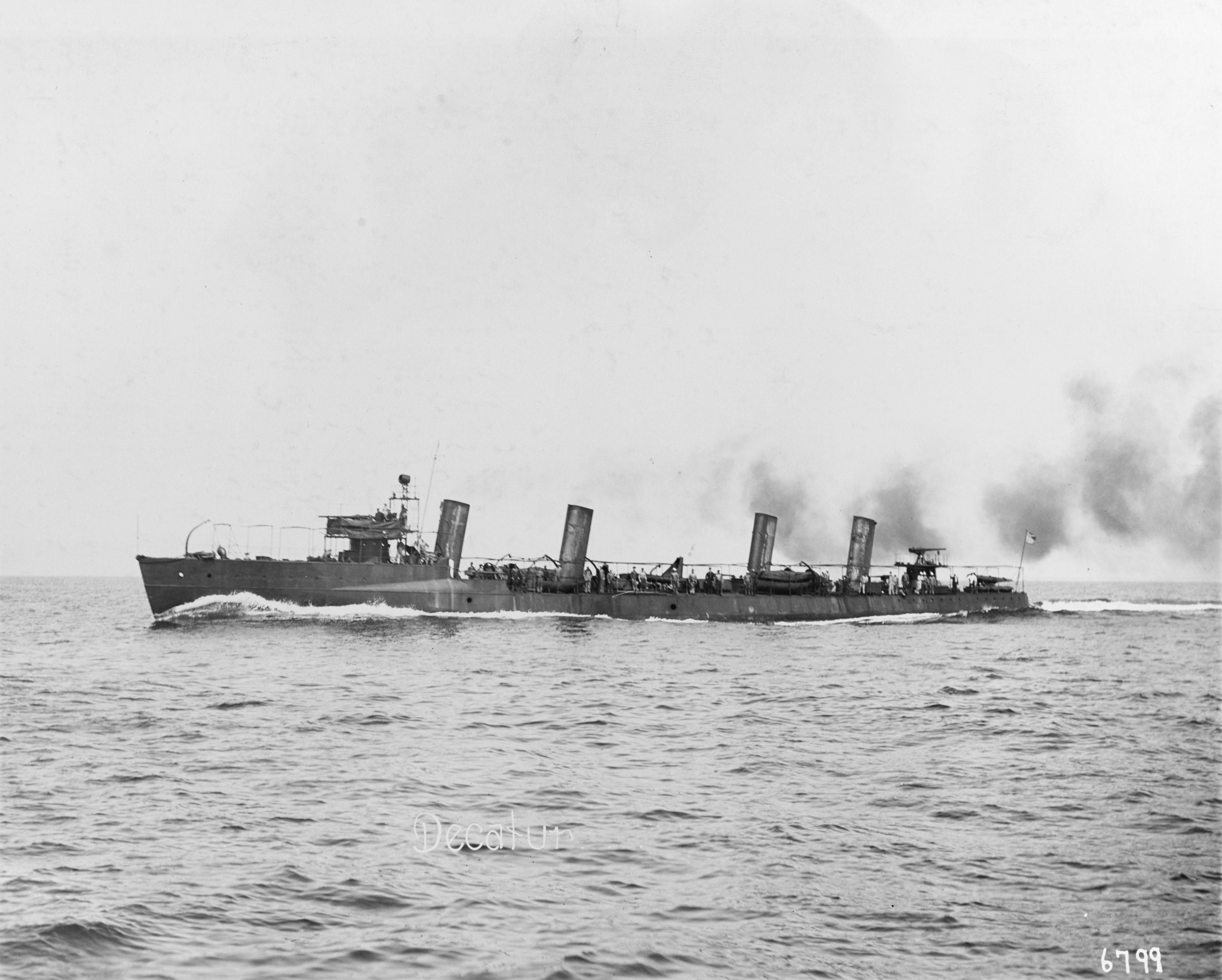
- USS Decatur steaming at high speed, while running trials in 1902.

History

United States
- Name: Decatur
- Namesake: Commodore Stephen Decatur
- Builder: William R. Trigg Company, Richmond, Virginia
- Laid down: 26 July 1899
- Launched: 26 September 1900
- Sponsored by: Miss Maria Decatur Mayo
- Commissioned: 19 May 1902
- Decommissioned: 20 July 1919
- Stricken: 15 September 1919
- Fate: Sold, 3 January 1920, and broken up for scrap

General characteristics
- Class & type: Bainbridge-class destroyer
- Displacement: 420 long tons (430 t) (standard); 592 long tons (601 t) (full load)
- Length: 245 ft (74.7 m) (pp); 250 ft (76.2 m) (oa)
- Beam: 23 ft 7 in (7.2 m)
- Draft: 6 ft 6 in (2 m) (mean)
- Installed power: 4 × Thornycroft boilers; 8,000 ihp (6,000 kW)
- Propulsion: 2 × Vertical triple expansion engines; 2 × Propellers
- Speed: 29 kn (54 km/h; 33 mph) (designed speed)
- Complement: 3 officers; 72 enlisted men
- Armament: 2 × 3 in (76 mm)/50 caliber guns; 5 × 6-pounder (57 mm (2.2 in)) guns; 2 × 18 in (457 mm) torpedo tubes

The second USS Decatur was a Bainbridge-class destroyer in the United States Navy. She was named in honor of Commodore Stephen Decatur.

== Construction ==
The second Decatur later designated, "Destroyer No. 5", was laid down on 26 July 1899, by the William R. Trigg Company, in Richmond, Virginia; launched on 26 September 1900; sponsored by Miss Maria Decatur Mayo, great-grandniece of Commodore Decatur; and commissioned at the Norfolk Navy Yard, Portsmouth, on 19 May 1902.

== Service history ==
=== Pre-World War I ===
Decatur was designated lead vessel of the 1st Torpedo Flotilla with whom she conducted drills and maneuvers along the Eastern Seaboard and in the Caribbean through the end of the year. During the summer of 1903, the flotilla was assigned to the Coast Squadron, North Atlantic Fleet, and took part in the search problem and joint maneuvers with the Army on the coast of Maine.

Decatur then shifted to Oyster Bay, New York, to participate in a Presidential review for President Theodore Roosevelt, from 15 to 17 August. After the review on 17 August, she cleared Long Island Sound that same day and steamed for Norfolk, reaching there on 19 August. While at Norfolk, she and her fellow members of the 1st Torpedo Flotilla were fitted out for distant service. All were detached from the Coast Squadron, North Atlantic Fleet, on 26 September. Getting underway again on 12 November, the destroyer operated from Hampton Roads and conducted exercises off the Virginia Capes into December. On 12 December, she departed Hampton Roads as part of the First Torpedo Flotilla, Bainbridge, Barry, Chauncey, Dale, and Baltimore. Bound for service with the Asiatic Squadron, they initially steamed southward to Port Royal, South Carolina, December 14–16, then on to Key West, December 18–23. While at Key West, the auxiliary cruiser Buffalo relieved Baltimore as the flotilla's escort for the remainder of the journey to the Far East. The force spent Christmas Day at sea and arrived at San Juan, Puerto Rico, on 29 December, and spent the New Year’s holidays in port there.

Resuming their eastward passage across the Atlantic, on 6 January 1904, the flotilla reached Las Palmas Gran Canaria, in the Canary Islands, on 18 January. Clearing the island on 24 January, the ships proceeded to Gibraltar January 27–31; Algiers, French Algeria, February 1–7; and Valetta, Malta, February 9–21. The flotilla and Buffalo had to lay over for twelve days while Barry went into drydock to have her propellers repaired after damaging them while mooring. With the repairs completed, they continued on to Port Said, Egypt, February 25–26 February, transited the Suez Canal to Suez, Egypt, February 28–29,before steaming down the Red Sea, to Aden, March 4–9. Steaming out of Aden, on 9 March, the flotilla crossed the Arabian Sea to Bombay, current day Mumbai, India, March 15–23, then proceeded to the British possessions at Colombo, Ceylon, current day Sri Lanka, March 26–27, and Singapore April 3–9,before steaming through the South China Sea to her new station in the Philippine Islands. The flotilla and its escort stood in to the Navy Yard at Cavite, on 14 April. Upon their arrival, the ships were assigned to the Torpedo Flotilla, Battleship Squadron, Asiatic Fleet.

The flotilla engaged in torpedo attacks and practical exercises with the "Battleship Squadron" on the China coast, May–October 1904. In March 1905, Decatur entered the yard at Hong Kong, for docking and overhaul. After returning to Cavite, on 15 April 1905, the flotilla conducted a cruise of the Philippine archipelago, as far south as the islands of Borneo, Tawi Tawi, and Mindanao. After this cruise, the flotilla crossed the South China Sea, and again conducted tactical training and exercises with the fleet's battleship and cruiser squadrons off the Chinese coast, from July–September.

Returning to the Philippines, Decatur was placed in reserve at Cavite, on 5 December 1905. For the next three years, she made infrequent cruises, two of note, however, included one to the southern Philippines, January–February 1908, and the other to Saigon, French Indochina, present day Ho Chi Minh City, Vietnam. Departing Cavite, she steamed for the French possession on 17 May 1908, and made her return ten days later. Seven weeks later, on 7 July 1908, Ensign Chester W. Nimitz, Decatur's commanding officer, ran the destroyer aground on a mudbank while bringing her into the harbor at Batangas. He was both unsure of his position and had failed to check the tides. When he could not get the ship off immediately, he ordered a cot to be brought to the bridge, and he slept until the tide rose and freed the ship. He was subsequently court-martialed and found guilty of neglect of duty. Given his otherwise exemplary record and ready willingness to accept responsibility for his failure, the court only issued the young Nimitz a letter of reprimand. Decatur was later placed out of commission at Olongapo Naval Station, on 18 February 1909.

Decatur was placed back into commission in reserve, on 22 April 1910 and then placed back into full commission, on 22 December 1910. The destroyer resumed training and operations with the Torpedo Flotilla, Asiatic Fleet, cruising in the southern Philippines. On 18 July 1911, she cleared Manila, and steamed to Shanghai, July 22–August 15, before visiting Japan. She called at Hakodate, Hokkaido, August 21–27, Yokohama, Honshu, August 29–September 14, and Nagasaki, Kyushu, September 17–25, before making her return to Shanghai, on 26 September. Departing on 20 October, she visited Siakwan, Siachwan Tao, then entered the Yangtze River, where she would remain into 1912, visiting cities like Chinkiang Wuhu, Shanghai, and Nanking,to 26 June, when she arrived at Shanghai, to dock at the yard there on 28 June 1912. Undocking on 12 July, she cleared the Yangtze, and went to sea to steam to Chefoo, July 22, before returning to Shanghai, on 24 July. Standing down the Yangtze, into the Yellow Sea, Decatur arrived back at Olongapo, on 5 August, then shifted to Manila, on 8 October. She returned to Olongapo, and docked there on 16 November. Undocking, she made a quick run to Manila, on Boxing Day, and returned to Olongapo, that same day. She remained there into 1913.

Decatur got underway on 24 March 1913, from Olongapo and steamed to Iloilo, March 25–31, before standing in to the Navy Yard at Cavite, on 1 April. Shifting back to Olongapo, on 5 May, she docked at the yard there. Clearing the yard, she periodically patrolled cruised Philippine waters and visited the multiple islands of the archipelago.

=== World War I ===
With the outbreak of World War I, in Europe, in August 1914, Decatur and the other destroyers of the flotilla cruised under orders in the southern islands of the Philippines, and remained in the archipelago into 1917. During that time, she laid out torpedo ranges, patrolled the entrance to Manila Bay, and was on reconnaissance duty when not engaged in target practices and training in tactical maneuvers. One incident of note occurred during this time. On 9 September 1915, there was an explosion in the ordnance workshop and storeroom, while the vessel was anchored off Cavite. The blast resulted in one enlisted man killed, two mortally wounded, and six others injured. Later that year, she cleared Manila, and steamed to China, visiting Amoy, November 8–10, and Shanghai, November 16–December 12, before making her return to Manila, on 17 December.

Getting underway with Dale in early January 1916, from Manila Bay, they made a tour of the southern islands of the Philippines calling at Zamboanga, Jolo, Bongao, Parang, and Isabela, before returning to Manila, on 21 February. The destroyer departed Cavite, on 9 August and steamed to Zamboanga, and other islands in the southern Philippines, before standing in to Olongapo on 18 October.

With the US declaration of war against Germany, on 6 April 1917, Decatur was still stationed in the Philippine Islands, based at Cavite, assigned to the 1st Destroyer Division, Torpedo Flotilla, Asiatic Fleet. She continued in this duty until 31 July.

Ordered to service in European waters, Decatur sailed from Cavite in company with Dale, Bainbridge, Barry, and Chauncey on 1 August 1917. The force was bound for Gibraltar, Base No. 9, via Kudat, British North Borneo, currently Brunei, Singapore, where they fell in with Caesar and the former-German merchantman, turned Asiatic Torpedo Flotilla flagship, Camilla Rickmers, Colombo, Bombay, and Aden. Passing through the Suez Canal, on 24 September, they entered the Mediterranean and steamed to Valetta. Camilla Rickmers' speed slowed the destroyers' transit to the Atlantic. Departing Malta, the destroyers set a course for Naples, Italy. While en route on 8 October, Decatur sighted a submarine around 13:00, off her starboard beam, approximately 3.5 mi (5.6 km) distant. She fired one shot from her forward 3 in (76 mm) gun just as the U-boat submerged. The shot, however, fell short. They saw no further evidence of the submarine for an hour, when at 14:00, the U-boat reappeared on the horizon about four miles (six point four kilometres) astern the destroyer. This was followed by an explosion and then the submarine was no longer seen. Continuing on, the flotilla reached Gibraltar, on 20 October. Vice Admiral William S. Sims, Commander, US Naval Forces Operating in European Waters, extended a commendation to the destroyer force on their successful passage from Cavite, to Gibraltar on 23 October.

Assigned to the US Patrol Squadrons, under Rear Admiral Albert P. Niblack, Decatur departed Gibraltar, on 29 October, in company with Dale and Northesk, to conduct an anti-submarine patrol, she returned the next morning without having made contact. This was the beginning of her convoy escort and anti-submarine patrol duties in both the Atlantic and Mediterranean.

On 21 December 1917, she entered dry dock, at the Gibraltar Navy Yard, and undocked after overhaul on 10 January 1918. While conducting a convoy escort mission on 22 February, the US merchantman SS Escoutney mistook Decatur for an enemy U-boat and fired seven shots at the destroyer. All the rounds fell short and the ship suffered no damage. Several weeks later, on 14 March, the ship's crew went to general quarters when a wake from a periscope was reported. The ship went to full speed and when the ship had closed to half the distance, the wake disappeared. She circled the area trying to confirm whether a submarine was actually present in order to fire a shot. With no further evidence of a submarine, she neither fired her guns nor dropped depth charges. Again on escort duty, just over a month later, on 16 April, Decatur traversed over what she believed was a submarine wake and dropped a depth charge with no positive result.

Decatur coaled on 1 May 1918, and received orders at noon the next day to get underway to proceed with Dale to meet Convoy G-Ga 20 which had been attacked by a U-boat at 03:00, clearing Gibraltar, at 15:40, the destroyers made their best speed and sighted the convoy at 13:00, on 3 May. Taking up station along with HMS Sweetbriar, the escorts conveyed the ships in to Gibraltar, on 4 May.

Decatur sortied again on 16 May 1918, with HMS Underwing, HMS Rule, Dale, and Bainbridge, escorting Convoy HG 76, with Tampa as ocean escort into the danger zone. While en route, Bainbridge sighted a suspicious object but there was negative contact. The escorts parted at 17:15. on 17 May, and proceeded southward to meet a 20-ship convoy escorted by HMS Gillia. Meeting the inbound convoy at daybreak on 18 May, they all stood in to Gibraltar, at 06:00, on 19 May.

Decatur sortied again on 9 June, this time in company with HMS Coreopsis, HMS Kilkeel, and Dale to escort the 29-ship Convoy HG 82, with HMS Kileclaire as ocean escort into the danger zone. Leaving HG 82 at noon on 10 June, they met Convoy OM 74, 15 ships with HMS Kildine as ocean escort, and brought them in to port on 11 June. Decatur was underway again on 12 June, with Coreopsis, Kilkeel, and Dale. Rendezvousing with the 11-ship convoy with Tampa as ocean escort off Ceuta, and escorted it through the straits to around 36°49′N 25°31′W, near the Azores, where they parted company to meet Birmingham and the seven ship OE convoy on 13 June, and shepherding them in to Gibraltar the next day. Underway again accompanied by Coreopsis, Rule, Kilkeel, and Dale, Decatur escorted Convoy HG 84's 19 ships through the danger zone on 17 June. The next day they were joined by HMS Active and Birmingham as ocean escort. Having brought HG 84 through the danger zone, the escorts parted company and stood to the northeast to await Convoy OM 76. This latter 14-ship convoy with Ossipee as ocean escort, was met at 16:00 on 18 June, and safely brought into Gibraltar the next day.

Dale entered the dockyard at Gibraltar on 1 July, for retubing her boilers. At the same time, Bainbridge and Barry were also deemed unfit and required to enter the yard for significant repairs and overhaul. As a result, this left the Destroyer Force at Gibraltar with only three serviceable ships, Decatur, HMS Northesk, and HMS Parthian, which prompted the dispatch of Gregory and Dyer, to Gibraltar.

Decatur continued to perform her escort duties through the summer and autumn of 1918. On 20 September, while at sea on escort duty with the Coast Guard cutter Seneca ahead, the destroyer sighted a U-boat on the starboard side of the convoy. Decatur went to full speed and steamed directly for the object. At 11:22, she dropped her first depth charge, followed by three additional, only two of which detonated. At 11:38, she sighted an oil slick, and dropped two further depth charges. There was no proof of positive result from the attack. In the waning days of the war, on 9 November, Decatur and HMS Defender were escorting the British pre-dreadnought battleship HMS Britannia, 11 mi (18 km) off Cape Spartel, west of Gibraltar, when at 07:14, the Britannia was torpedoed by UB-50. In response, Decatur went to full speed and dropped four depth charges to keep the U-boat submerged. Parker and Luce, also sped to the scene and responded likewise. Other ships arrived to assist with salvage attempts, but the battleship sank at 10:47. Afterward, Decatur returned to Gibraltar. Two days after the sinking, the Armistice ending hostilities went into effect on 11 November.

=== Post-WW I ===
With the war over, Decatur was dispatched for a return to the United States. Clearing Gibraltar, on 8 December 1918, she steamed to Lisbon, Portugal, December 9–11, thence to Ponta Delgada, Base No. 13, Azores, December 13–20, then on to Bermuda, Base No. 24, where she arrived on 29 December. She remained there through the end of the year and into January 1919. Her departure was delayed by the need to rivet a strengthening strap to reinforce her hull. With her repairs completed she departed on 5 February 1919.

Decatur finally made her return to the US, standing in to the Philadelphia Navy Yard, on 6 February 1919. The destroyer was decommissioned there on 20 June 1919. Stricken from the Navy list on 15 September, Decatur was sold on 3 January 1920, to Henry A. Hitner's Sons Company, Philadelphia, for scrapping.

== Noteworthy commanding officers ==
- Lieutenant Lloyd Horwitz Chandler, 19 May 1902 – 22 April 1904, later Rear Admiral
- Lieutenant Dudley Wright Knox, 22 April 1904 – 24 March 1906, later Commodore, Knox-class frigate named in his honor
- Ensign Chester William Nimitz, 1 July 1908 – 29 July 1908, later Fleet admiral and Chief of Naval Operations – Nimitz-class aircraft carrier named in his honor
- Lieutenant commander Harry Adrian McClure, 31 January 1918 – 4 August 1918, later Commodore

== Bibliography ==
- Havern, Christopher B. (19 April 2018). "Decatur II (Destroyer No. 5)". Dictionary of American Naval Fighting Ships. Naval History and Heritage Command. This article incorporates text from this source, which is in the public domain.
- "USS DECATUR (DD-5)". NavSource.
