= USS Bailey (TB-21) =

Torpedo boat of the United States Navy

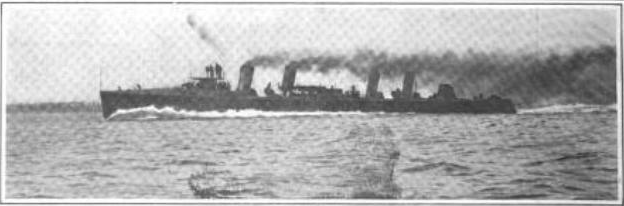
- USS Bailey, undergoing sea trials, May 1901

History

United States
- Name: Bailey
- Namesake: Rear Admiral Theodorus Bailey
- Ordered: 3 March 1897 (authorised)
- Builder: Gas Engine & Power Company & Charles L. Seabury Company, Morris Heights, NY
- Laid down: 30 April 1898
- Launched: 5 December 1899
- Sponsored by: Miss Florence Beekman Bailey
- Commissioned: 10 June 1901
- Decommissioned: 18 March 1919
- Renamed: Coast Torpedo Boat No. 8, 1 August 1918
- Stricken: 28 October 1919
- Fate: Sold for scrapping, 10 March 1920

General characteristics
- Class & type: Bailey-class torpedo boat
- Displacement: 280 long tons (284 t)
- Length: 205 ft (62 m)
- Beam: 19 ft 3 in (5.87 m)
- Draft: 6 ft 10 in (2.08 m) (mean)
- Installed power: 4 × Seabury boilers; 5,600 ihp (4,200 kW)
- Propulsion: vertical triple expansion engine; 2 × screw propellers
- Speed: 30 knots (56 km/h; 35 mph); 30.20 kn (34.75 mph; 55.93 km/h) (Speed on Trial)
- Complement: 59 officers and enlisted
- Armament: 4 × 6-pounder (57 mm (2.24 in)) guns; 2 × 18 inch (450 mm) torpedo tubes (2x1)

The second USS Bailey (Torpedo Boat No. 21/TB-21/Coast Torpedo Boat No. 8) was laid down on 30 April 1898 at Morris Heights, N.Y., by the Gas Engine & Power Co. & Charles L. Seabury Co.; launched on 5 December 1899; sponsored by Miss Florence Beekman Bailey; and commissioned at the New York Navy Yard on 10 June 1901, Lt. George W. Williams in command.

== Service history ==
Three days after commissioning, Bailey got underway for the Torpedo Station, Newport, R.I., where she served for several months. She headed south in October and arrived at Port Royal, S.C., on the last day of the month. The torpedo boat stayed there until June 1902 when she moved to Norfolk, Va., where she was placed out of commission on the 14th of the month. The warship was put into commission, in reserve, on 27 January 1904. As a unit of the Reserve Torpedo Flotilla, she spent most of her time tied up at a pier in Norfolk because of a shortage of personnel. However, the warship did put to sea occasionally to test her machinery, armaments, and equipment. She was placed back in full commission on 7 November 1909 for the voyage to the Charleston Navy Yard where she again went into reserve on 22 December 1909.

Photo from Jane's Fighting Ships 1914

Bailey was returned to full commission on 1 June 1910 and cruised the Atlantic coast for several months in the 1st Torpedo Division. Detached from that organization on 14 September 1910, the torpedo boat moved to Annapolis, Md., where she undertook duty training midshipmen at the U.S. Naval Academy and performing services for the engineering experimentation station located there. In October 1911, Bailey joined the Reserve Torpedo Division at Annapolis and continued in that status until she was placed in ordinary at the Naval Academy on 1 April 1914.

Bailey remained inactive at Annapolis until two months before the United States entered World War I. On 6 February 1917, she was returned to full commission and assigned temporarily to patrol duty out of Norfolk, Va. On 10 May 1917, the torpedo boat departed Norfolk for her permanent wartime station New York City. She spent the remainder of the war patrolling the waters in and around New York state, and, on 1 August 1918, in order to clear the name Bailey for a new destroyer, the ship was renamed Coast Torpedo Boat No. 8. Following the armistice, she continued active service at New York until ordered to Philadelphia on 17 January 1919. She arrived at the Philadelphia Navy Yard on 5 February 1919 and was placed out of commission for the last time on 18 March 1919. Her name was struck from the Naval Vessel Register on 28 October 1919, and she was sold to the U.S. Rail & Salvage Corp., Newburgh, N.Y., on 10 March 1920 for scrapping.
