= USS Biddle (TB-26) =

Torpedo boat of the United States Navy

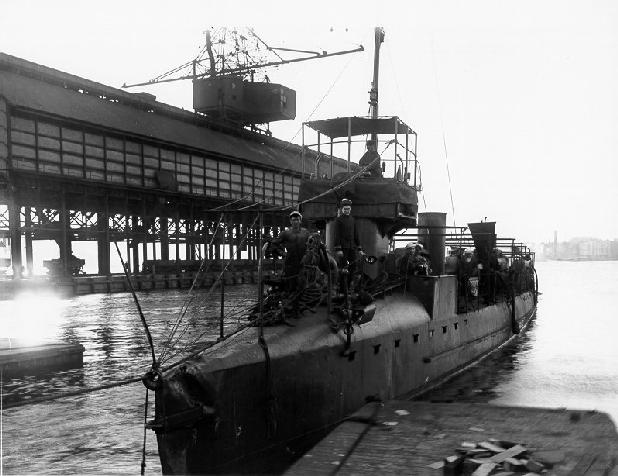

History

United States
- Name: Biddle
- Namesake: Captain Nicholas Biddle
- Ordered: 4 May 1898 (authorized)
- Builder: Bath Iron Works, Bath, ME
- Laid down: 21 February 1900
- Launched: 18 May 1901
- Sponsored by: Miss Emily B. Biddle, great-great-grandniece of Captain Biddle
- Commissioned: 26 October 1901
- Decommissioned: 12 March 1919
- Renamed: Coast Torpedo Boat No. 12, 1 August 1918
- Identification: TB-26
- Fate: Sold, 19 July 1920

General characteristics
- Class & type: Bagley-class torpedo boat
- Displacement: 175 long tons (178 t)
- Length: 157 ft (48 m)
- Beam: 17 ft 8 in (5.38 m)
- Draft: 4 ft 11 in (1.50 m) (mean)
- Installed power: 2 × Normand boilers; 4,200 ihp (3,100 kW)
- Propulsion: vertical triple expansion engine; 2 × screw propellers
- Speed: 28.6 knots (53.0 km/h; 32.9 mph); 28.54 kn (32.84 mph; 52.86 km/h) (Speed on Trial)
- Complement: 28 officers and enlisted
- Armament: 3 × 1-pounder (37 mm (1.46 in)) guns; 3 × 18 inch (450 mm) torpedo tubes (3x1)

The first USS Biddle (Torpedo Boat No. 26/TB-26/Coast Torpedo Boat No. 12) was a torpedo boat in the United States Navy. She was named for Captain Nicholas Biddle.

Biddle was launched 18 May 1901 by Bath Iron Works, Ltd., Bath, Maine; sponsored by Miss Emily B. Biddle, great-great-grandniece of Captain Biddle; and commissioned 26 October 1901, Lieutenant S. S. Robison in command.

Biddle departed Newport, Rhode Island, 1 November 1901 for Port Royal, South Carolina where she went into reserve. Following recommissioning 28 May 1902 she cruised with the Torpedo Boat Flotilla along the Atlantic coast and in the West Indies until January 1903. She went into reserve again 16 February 1903 at Norfolk Navy Yard and remained there until recommissioned 14 May 1909. Biddle spent the summer cruising with the Atlantic Torpedo Fleet and then went into reserve at Charleston Navy Yard 18 November 1909. In October 1911 she shifted to the Reserve Flotilla Division at Annapolis, Maryland, and went into ordinary at the Naval Academy, 13 March 1914.

After serving with the Pennsylvania Naval Militia (June–September 1915) Biddle reverted to the Annapolis Reserve torpedo Division. Recommissioned 6 April 1917 she served in the 5th Naval District as a patrol and despatch vessel at Norfolk. Biddle was renamed Coast Torpedo Boat No. 12, 1 August 1918.

Ordered to Philadelphia Navy Yard in January 1919, she was decommissioned 12 March 1919 and sold 19 July 1920.

== Bibliography ==
- Eger, Christopher L. (March 2021). "Hudson Fulton Celebration, Part II". Warship International. LVIII (1): 58–81. ISSN 0043-0374.
- Additional technical data from Gardiner, Robert (1979). Conway's All the World's Fighting Ships 1860–1905. Conway Maritime Press. p. 161. ISBN 0-85177-133-5.
