= USS Morris (TB-14) =

Torpedo boat of the United States Navy

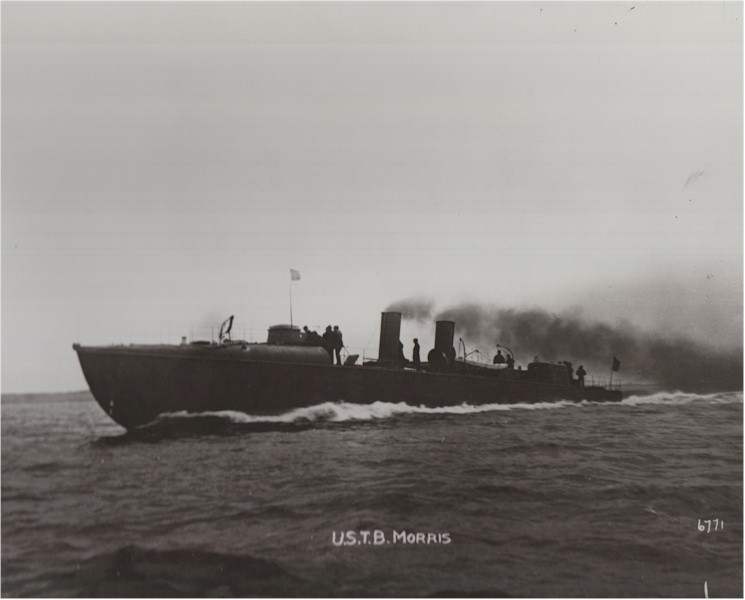
- USS Morris (TB-14), circa 1898, location unknown

History

United States
- Namesake: Commodore Robert Morris
- Ordered: 6 June 1896 (authorised)
- Builder: Herreshoff Manufacturing Co., Bristol, RI
- Laid down: 19 November 1897
- Launched: 13 April 1898
- Commissioned: 11 May 1898
- Renamed: Coast Torpedo Boat No. 6; 1 August 1918
- Stricken: 24 January 1924
- Identification: TB-14
- Fate: Sold at public auction, 10 October 1924

General characteristics
- Class & type: Morris-class torpedo boat
- Displacement: 105 long tons (107 t)
- Length: 139 ft 6 in (42.52 m)
- Beam: 15 ft 4 in (4.67 m)
- Draft: 4 ft 1 in (1.24 m) (mean)
- Installed power: 2 × Normand boiler boilers; 1,750 ihp (1,300 kW)
- Propulsion: vertical triple expansion engines; 2 × screw propellers
- Speed: 23 kn (26 mph; 43 km/h); 24 kn (28 mph; 44 km/h) (Speed on Trial)
- Complement: 26 officers and enlisted
- Armament: 3 × 1-pounder (37 mm (1.46 in)) guns; 3 × 18 inch (450 mm) torpedo tubes (3x1)

The fifth USS Morris (Torpedo Boat No. 14/TB-14/Coast Torpedo Boat No. 6) was laid down by Herreshoff Manufacturing Co., Bristol, RI, 19 November 1897; launched 13 April 1898; and commissioned 11 May 1898.

After east coast shakedown, Morris arrived Newport Rhode Island, for range tender and training services until World War I, when patrol duties were assigned. From 19 April 1918 through early March 1919 she patrolled the West Indies, until the Armistice investigating suspected enemy sabotage. Now known as Coast Torpedo Boat No. 6, she returned to Newport and decommissioned 24 March 1919, but served as torpedo range tender there for 5 years. Last of the old torpedo boats, she was struck from the Naval Register 24 January 1924, and sold at public auction 10 October 1924 to Frank B. Jones of Wilmington, Delaware.
