= USS Ericsson (TB-2) =

Torpedo boat of the United States Navy

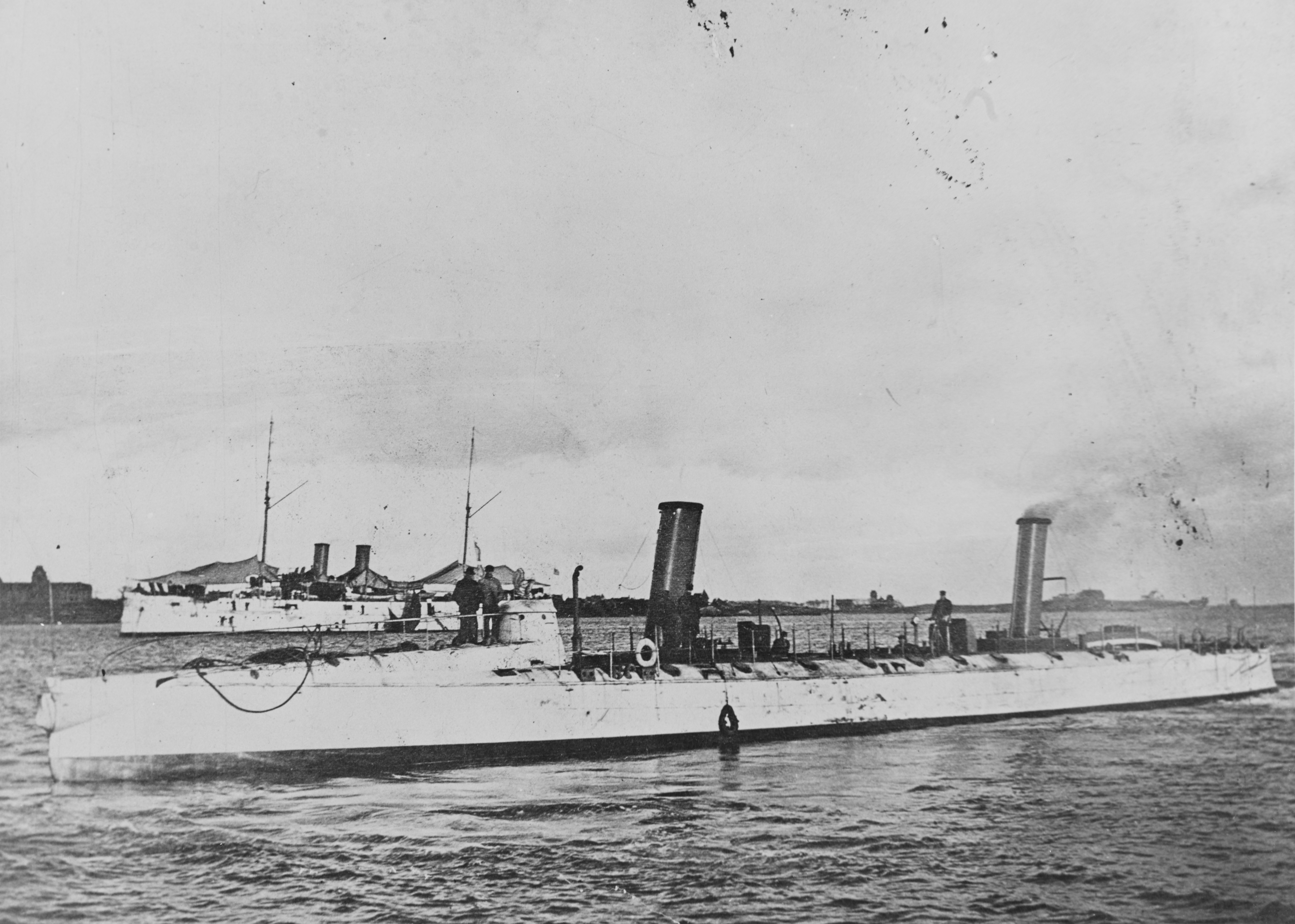
- USS Ericsson (TB-2), photographed circa 1897-98, with either USS Cincinnati or USS Raleigh in the left background.

History

United States
- Name: Ericsson
- Ordered: 30 June 1890 (authorised)
- Builder: Iowa Iron Works, Dubuque, Iowa
- Laid down: 21 July 1892
- Launched: 12 May 1894
- Sponsored by: Miss Carrie Kiene
- Commissioned: 18 February 1897
- Decommissioned: 5 April 1912
- Identification: TB-2
- Fate: Sunk as target

General characteristics
- Class & type: Ericsson-class torpedo boat
- Displacement: 120 long tons (120 t)
- Length: 149 ft 7 in (45.59 m)
- Beam: 15 ft 6 in (4.72 m)
- Draft: 4 ft 9 in (1.45 m) (mean)
- Installed power: 2 × Thornycroft boilers; 1,800 ihp (1,300 kW)
- Propulsion: 2 × vertical quadruple-expansion reciprocating steam engines; 2 × screw propellers
- Speed: 24 kn (28 mph; 44 km/h)
- Complement: 22 officers and enlisted
- Armament: 4 × 1-pounder (37 mm (1.46 in)) guns; 3 × 18 inch (450 mm) torpedo tubes

The first USS Ericsson (Torpedo Boat # 2/TB-2) was the second torpedo boat built for the United States Navy. The first,Cushing, had been built seven years earlier.

Ericsson was launched on 12 May 1894 by Iowa Iron Works, Dubuque, Iowa; sponsored by Miss Carrie Kiene; and commissioned on 18 February 1897. It was named for John Ericsson, designer of the USS Monitor.

== Service history ==
=== Pre-Spanish–American War ===
On 18 May 1897, Ericsson arrived at Newport, Rhode Island, her home port. Through the summer months, she cruised New England waters for trials and training, instructing regular and reserve officers in torpedo tactics. She left Newport on 18 September for a cruise to Annapolis, Norfolk, Wilmington, Charleston, Savannah, and several ports in Florida, arriving at Key West on the last day of the year. This was to be her base for operations in the Caribbean during the next seven months.

=== Spanish–American War ===
As war with Spain approached, Ericsson patrolled the Florida Keys, intensified her training operations, and carried messages for the increasing number of the fleet present in the area. She continued this duty after the opening of the war, then on 22 April 1898 began a blockade patrol between Havana and Key West. She joined the fleet at Santiago, Cuba 20 June, and during the Battle of Santiago de Cuba on 3 July, was in the thick of the fight, firing on the Spanish fleet. As the defeated Spanish ships blazed and threatened to explode, Ericsson played a leading part in the rescue efforts through which men of the U.S. Navy that day showed their courage, skill, and determination as clearly as they had in the fighting. She laid herself alongside the Spanish cruiser Vizcaya, ignoring the fact that the Spanish ship's ammunition was already exploding, and that flames were firing the loaded guns. Over 100 Spanish officers and men were thus saved, and more were taken off the flagship Maria Teresa and Oquendo, as Ericsson towed small craft from her squadron's larger ships to the burning hulks.

=== Post-war fate ===
Ericsson patrolled off Cuba through mid-August 1898, and on 23 August arrived at New York, where she was decommissioned on 21 September and laid up. In December 1900, she was returned to commission, still in reserve, then sailed for Norfolk, Virginia, where on 6 March 1901 she was assigned to the Reserve Torpedo Flotilla. In October 1908, she moved to Charleston Navy Yard, where she was decommissioned on 5 April 1912 and later sunk in ordnance tests.
