= USS Manley (TB-23) =

Torpedo boat of the United States Navy

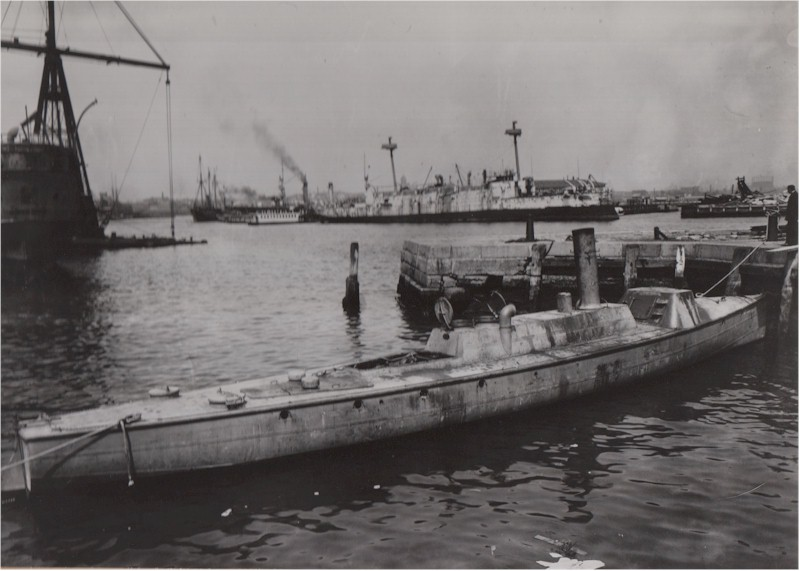
- USS Manley (TB-23) at the New York Navy Yard, about 1898. The cruisers Chicago and Atlanta are in the background undergoing modernization.

History

United Kingdom
- Owner: Charles R. Flint
- Builder: Yarrow & Co., Ltd., Poplar, London
- Fate: Sold to US Navy 13 April 1898

United States
- Name: Manley
- Namesake: Captain John Manley
- Acquired: purchased 13 April 1898
- In service: 20 April 1899
- Out of service: 1 April 1914
- Renamed: Levant, 11 April 1918
- Stricken: 2 April 1914
- Fate: Sold, 21 April 1920, to Jacob Meyer of Cantonsville, MD.
- Notes: training ship for the midshipmen until 1914, continued to serve as a ferry launch at Annapolis after being struck

General characteristics
- Class & type: Manley-class torpedo boat
- Displacement: 30 long tons (30 t)
- Length: 60 ft 8 in (18.49 m)
- Beam: 9 ft 5 in (2.87 m)
- Draft: 2 ft 11 in (0.89 m) (mean)
- Speed: 17 knots (31 km/h; 20 mph)
- Complement: 5 officers and enlisted
- Armament: none

USS Manley (Torpedo Boat No. 23/TB-23) more often spelled Manly, was built by Yarrow & Co., Ltd., Poplar, London, England; purchased from Charles R. Flint 13 April 1898 during the Spanish–American War; and delivered to the New York Navy Yard to be placed in service.

Assigned to the Naval Auxiliary Force, Manley was laid up in ordinary for repairs 25 October 1898. On 20 April 1899 she left New York City for the US Naval Academy, Annapolis, Md.; and served there as a training ship for the midshipmen until 1914, except for a brief period during 1906 and 1907 when the torpedo boat was assigned to the Reserve Torpedo Flotilla at the Norfolk Navy Yard. On 1 April 1914 she was placed out of service and the next day was struck from the Navy list, but she continued to serve as a ferry launch at Annapolis. Renamed Levant April 1918 when USS Manley (DD-74) took the name Manley, the torpedo boat was sold 21 April 1920 to Jacob Meyer of Catonsville, Md.
