= USS Wilkes (TB-35) =

Torpedo boat of the United States Navy

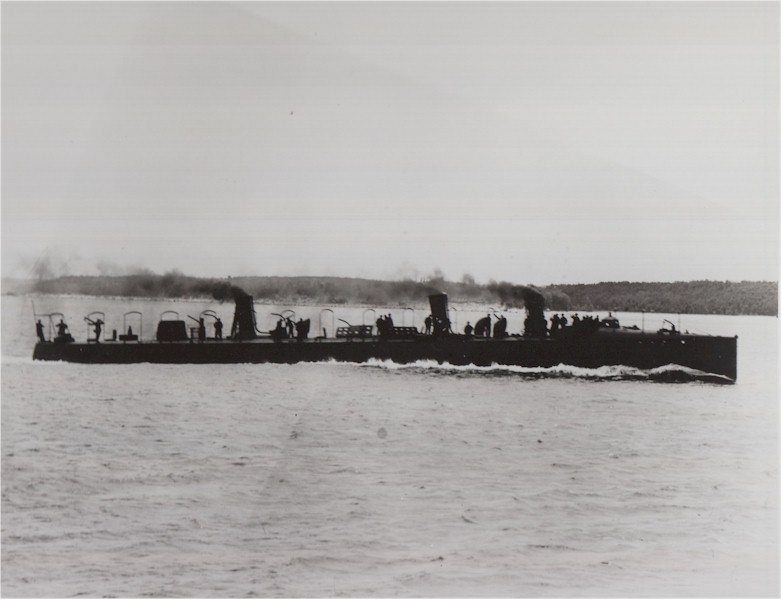
- USS Wilkes (TB-35), trnning trials before installation of armament, about 1901.

History

United States
- Name: Wilkes
- Namesake: Rear admiral Charles Wilkes
- Builder: Gas Engine & Power Company & Charles L. Seabury Company, Morris Heights, New York
- Laid down: 3 June 1899
- Launched: 28 September 1901
- Sponsored by: Miss Harriet E. Rankin
- Commissioned: 18 September 1902
- Decommissioned: 14 November 1913
- Stricken: 15 November 1913
- Fate: Sunk as a target, 1914

General characteristics
- Class & type: Blakely-class torpedo boat
- Displacement: 165 long tons (168 t)
- Length: 175 ft (53 m)
- Beam: 17 ft 7 in (5.36 m)
- Draft: 4 ft 8 in (1.42 m) (mean)
- Installed power: not known
- Propulsion: not known
- Speed: 25.99 kn (29.91 mph; 48.13 km/h) (Speed on Trial)
- Complement: 28 officers and enlisted
- Armament: 3 × 1-pounder, 3 × 18 inch (450 mm) torpedo tubes

The first USS Wilkes (TB-35) was a Blakely-class torpedo boat in the United States Navy.

== Built in New York ==
Wilkes was laid down on 3 June 1899 at Morris Heights, New York, by the Gas Engine and Power Company and the Charles L. Seabury & Co.; launched on 28 September 1901; sponsored by Miss Harriet E. Rankin; and commissioned at the Norfolk Navy Yard on 18 September 1902, Lt. (jg.) Dudley Wright Knox in command.

== U.S. Navy service ==
Wilkes spent the bulk of her career in reserve. Soon after her commissioning, she was assigned to the Reserve Torpedo Flotilla based at Norfolk, Virginia. There, she remained until the winter of 1906 and 1907 when she briefly returned to full commission for service with the 3rd Torpedo Flotilla.

On 30 May 1907, she was again placed in reserve with the Reserve Torpedo Flotilla at Norfolk. There, she remained until 23 November 1908 when she was recommissioned and assigned to duty with the Atlantic Torpedo Fleet based at Charleston, South Carolina.

== Decommissioning ==
On 22 December 1909, she went back into reserve, this time at the Charleston Navy Yard. Apparently in commission, in reserve, while at Charleston, Wilkes was decommissioned there on 14 November 1913, and her name was struck from the Navy list on the following day. She was sunk as a target in the summer or fall of 1914.

== Bibliography ==
- Eger, Christopher L. (March 2021). "Hudson Fulton Celebration, Part II". Warship International. LVIII (1): 58–81. ISSN 0043-0374.
- Sieche, Erwin F. (1990). "Austria-Hungary's Last Visit to the USA". Warship International. XXVII (2): 142–164. ISSN 0043-0374.
