= USS DeLong (TB-28) =

United States Navy torpedo boat

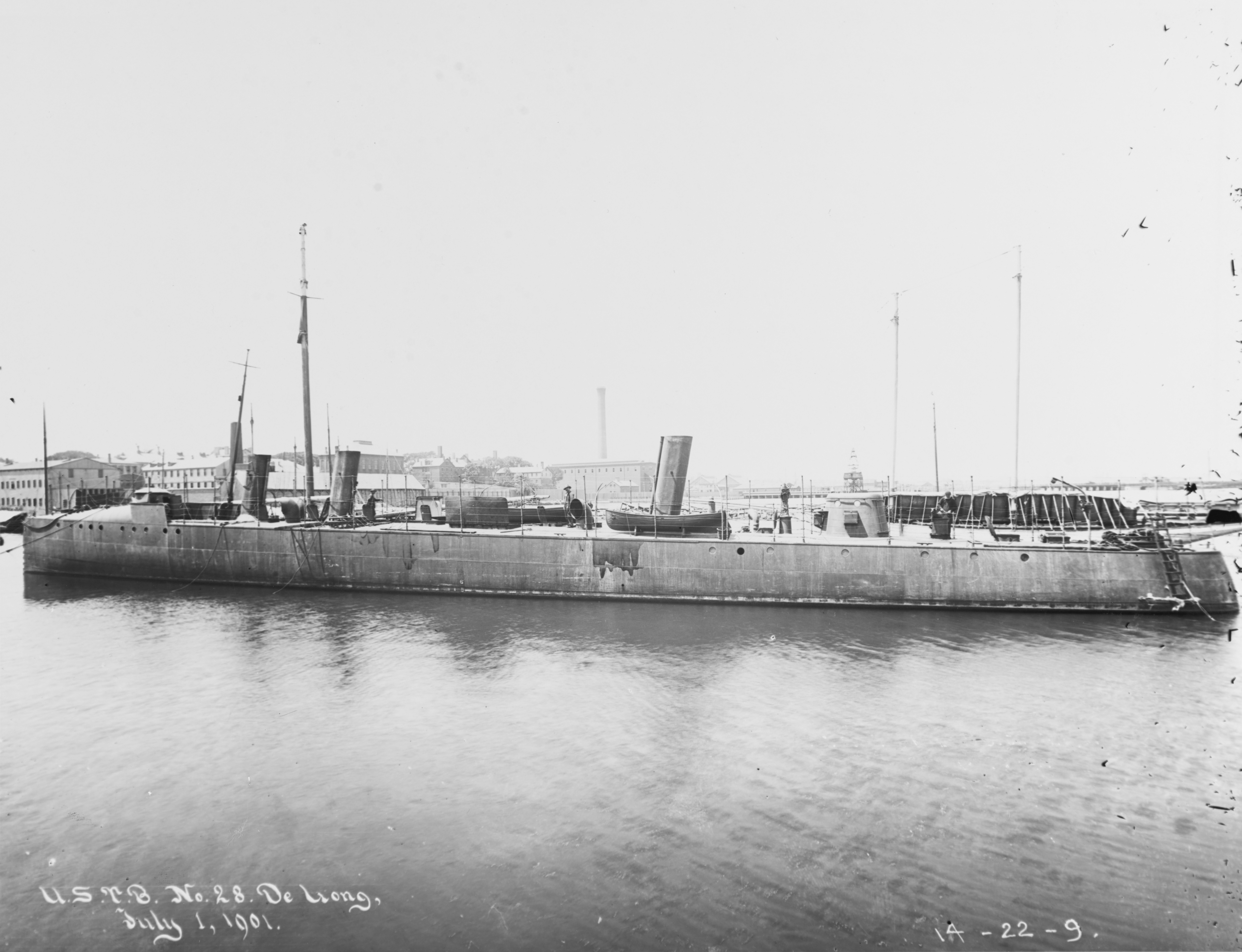
- USS DeLong fitting out, 1 July 1901

History

United States
- Name: DeLong
- Namesake: Lieutenant Commander George W. De Long
- Ordered: 4 May 1898 (authorised)
- Builder: George Lawley & Son, South Boston, MA
- Laid down: 24 January 1899
- Launched: 23 November 1900
- Commissioned: 27 October 1902
- Decommissioned: 8 March 1919
- Renamed: Coast Torpedo Boat No. 14, 1 August 1918
- Fate: Sold for scrapping, 19 July 1920

General characteristics
- Class & type: Blakely-class torpedo boat
- Displacement: 196 long tons (199 t)
- Length: 175 ft (53 m)
- Beam: 17 ft 8 in (5.38 m)
- Draft: 5 ft 11 in (1.80 m) (mean)
- Installed power: 3 × Normand boilers; 3,000 shp (2,200 kW)
- Propulsion: vertical triple expansion engines; 2 × screw propellers
- Speed: 26 kn (30 mph; 48 km/h); 25.52 kn (29.37 mph; 47.26 km/h) (Speed on Trial)
- Complement: 29 officers and enlisted
- Armament: 3 × 1-pounder, 3 × 18 inch (450 mm) torpedo tubes

USS DeLong (Torpedo Boat No. 28/TB-28/Coast Torpedo Boat No. 14) was a United States Navy Blakely class torpedo boat and minesweeper. DeLong (TB-28) was launched 23 November 1900 by George Lawley & Son, South Boston, Massachusetts; sponsored by Mrs. S. DeL. Mills, daughter of Lieutenant Commander George W. De Long; and commissioned 27 October 1902.

Between 4 November 1902 and 2 July 1906, the DeLong was assigned to the Reserve Torpedo Flotilla at Norfolk, Virginia, then was returned to full commission for torpedo practice and training along the Atlantic coast and in the Gulf of Mexico. Again out of commission between 7 August 1909 and 30 April 1910, this time at Boston, the DeLong was in reserve at Charleston from 20 May 1910, going to sea occasionally to maintain her readiness for action. She lay in ordinary between 14 March 1914 and 7 April 1917, when upon the entry of the United States into World War I, she was recommissioned and fitted out as a minesweeper.

The DeLong was based on Norfolk for minesweeping duty until 2 May 1918, when she sailed for Halifax, Nova Scotia, and patrol duty with the Submarine Chaser Flotilla. She also escorted seaplanes to sea for the Naval Aero Squadron based at Halifax, and from 1 August 1918 was known as Coast Torpedo Boat No. 14. She returned from Halifax to Boston 18 January 1919, and arrived at Philadelphia 4 February. There she was decommissioned 8 March 1919 and sold for scrapping 19 July 1920.

== Bibliography ==
- Eger, Christopher L. (March 2021). "Hudson Fulton Celebration, Part II". Warship International. LVIII (1): 58–81. ISSN 0043-0374.
- Sieche, Erwin F. (1990). "Austria-Hungary's Last Visit to the USA". Warship International. XXVII (2): 142–164. ISSN 0043-0374.
- Technical data from Gardiner, Robert (1979). Conway's All the World's Fighting Ships 1860–1905. Conway Maritime Press. p. 162. ISBN 0-85177-133-5.
