= USS Dahlgren (TB-9) =

Torpedo boat of the United States Navy

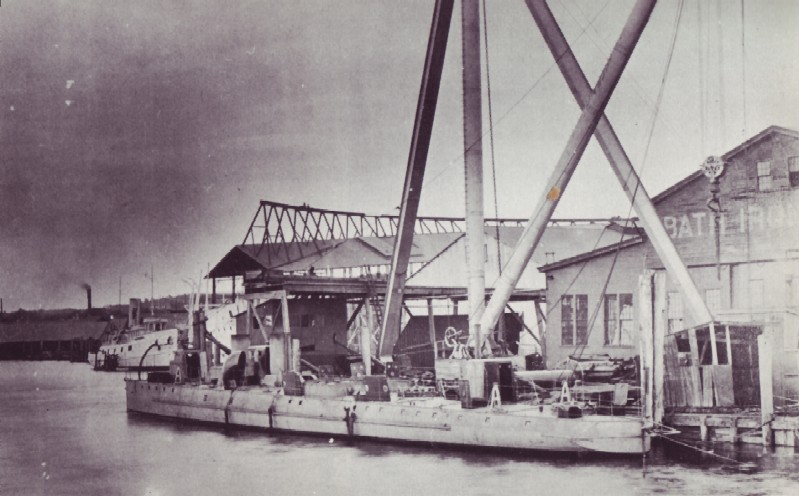
- USS Dahlgen (TB-9) fitting out at Bath, Maine, in 1899.

History

United States
- Name: Dahlgren
- Namesake: Rear admiral John A. Dahlgren
- Ordered: 10 June 1896
- Builder: Bath Iron Works, Bath, ME
- Laid down: 11 December 1897
- Launched: 29 May 1899
- Sponsored by: Mrs. J. V. Dahlgren, daughter-in-law of Rear Admiral Dahlgren
- Commissioned: 16 June 1900
- Decommissioned: 11 March 1919
- Renamed: Coast Torpedo Boat No. 4, 1 August 1918
- Identification: TB-9
- Fate: Sold, 19 July 1920

General characteristics
- Class & type: Dahlgren-class torpedo boat
- Displacement: 136 long tons (138 t)
- Length: 161 ft 4 in (49.17 m)
- Beam: 16 ft 4 in (4.98 m)
- Draft: 4 ft 7 in (1.40 m) (mean)
- Installed power: 2 × Normand boilers; 4,200 ihp (3,132 kW)
- Propulsion: vertical triple expansion engines; 2 × screw propellers
- Speed: 30 knots (56 km/h; 35 mph)
- Complement: 29 officers and enlisted
- Armament: 4 × 1-pounder (37 mm (1.46 in)) guns; 2 × 18 inch (450 mm) torpedo tubes (2x1)

USS Dahlgren (Torpedo Boat No. 9/TB-9/Coast Torpedo Boat No. 4), was a Torpedo Boat in the United States Navy.

== History ==
She was launched 29 May 1899 by Bath Iron Works, Bath, Maine; sponsored by Mrs. J. V. Dahlgren, daughter-in-law of Rear Admiral Dahlgren; and commissioned 16 June 1900.

Assigned to the Atlantic Torpedo Fleet, Dahlgren operated out of Portsmouth, N.H., and Newport, R.I., developing tactics for her new type of ship and training crews until 20 October 1900 when she returned to Portsmouth and was placed out of commission for repairs and alterations.

In partial commission from 7 June 1902, she sailed to Newport 13 June for an overhaul until 18 November 1902. The next day she was placed in full commission and reported to New Suffolk, L.I., to assume duty as a station ship until 28 October 1903. She again went out of commission 22 December 1903 at New York Navy Yard.

Assigned to the Naval Training Stations at Newport and New York during 1905, Dahlgren was placed in reduced commission 13 December 1905 and reported to the Reserve Torpedo Flotilla at Norfolk. Changing her base to Charleston, South Carolina, 15 October 1908, she continued to serve in torpedo developmental operations until placed in ordinary 14 March 1914.

After being fitted for minesweeping, Dahlgren was placed in full commission 1 April 1917 and served on escort and harbor entrance patrol at Norfolk until 5 December 1917. Renamed Coast Torpedo Boat No. 4, 1 August 1918, she arrived at Philadelphia Navy Yard from Norfolk 27 January 1918,"and there was placed out of commission 11 March 1919. She was sold 19 July 1920.
