= USS Barney (TB-25) =

Torpedo boat of the United States Navy

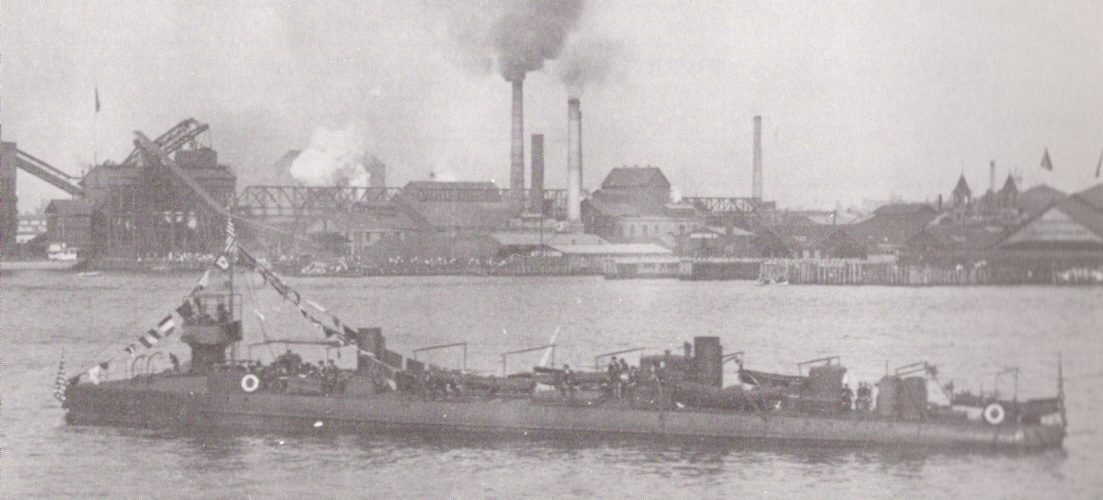
- USS Barney (TB-25) at Camden, New Jersey, in 1908.

History

United States
- Name: Barney
- Namesake: Commodore Joshua Barney
- Ordered: 4 May 1898 authorized
- Builder: Bath Iron Works, Bath, ME
- Laid down: 3 January 1900
- Launched: 28 July 1900
- Sponsored by: Miss Esther Nicholson Barney, great-granddaughter of Commodore Joshua Barney
- Commissioned: 21 October 1901
- Decommissioned: 11 March 1919
- Renamed: Coast Torpedo Boat No. 11, 1 August 1918
- Stricken: 28 October 1919
- Identification: TB-25
- Fate: Sold, 19 July 1920

General characteristics
- Class & type: Bagley-class torpedo boat
- Displacement: 175 long tons (178 t)
- Length: 157 ft (48 m)
- Beam: 17 ft 7 in (5.36 m)
- Draft: 4 ft 11 in (1.50 m) (mean)
- Installed power: 2 × Normand boilers; 4,200 ihp (3,100 kW)
- Propulsion: vertical triple expansion engine; 2 × screw propellers
- Speed: 29 knots (54 km/h; 33 mph); 29.04 kn (33.42 mph; 53.78 km/h) (Speed on Trial)
- Complement: 29 officers and enlisted
- Armament: 3 × 1-pounder (37 mm (1.46 in)) guns; 3 × 18 inch (450 mm) torpedo tubes (3x1)

The first USS Barney (Torpedo Boat No. 25/TB-25/Coast Torpedo Boat No. 11) was laid down on 3 January 1900 at Bath, Maine, by the Bath Iron Works; launched on 28 July 1900 and sponsored by Miss Esther Nicholson Barney, great-granddaughter of Commodore Joshua Barney; and placed in commission at the Naval Torpedo Station, Newport, Rhode Island, on 21 October 1901.

On 6 November 1901, the torpedo boat put to sea for a voyage to Port Royal, South Carolina but upon her arrival there, went into reserve. The following year, she returned to active service on the North Atlantic station and participated in maneuvers and exercises along the eastern seaboard and in the West Indies. On 19 February 1903, Barney was placed in reserve at Norfolk, Virginia. As a unit of the Reserve Torpedo Flotilla between 1903 and 1908, she remained inactive there but for brief periods underway to check out her machinery and torpedo equipment.

On 1 July 1908, the torpedo boat returned to full commission and cruised off the east coast as a unit of the 3d Torpedo Flotilla. On 18 October 1908 she had a minor collision in dense fog with Dennis Simmons in the area of Norfolk, Virginia resulting in slight damage to both vessels. The following December, she rejoined the Reserve Torpedo Flotilla at Norfolk. In August 1909, the warship moved to Charleston, South Carolina, but remained in reserve. From 1911 to 1914, she was based at Annapolis, Maryland, as a training ship for US Naval Academy midshipmen. She also cruised in the Potomac River on occasion to train members of the District of Columbia Naval Militia. At the end of February 1916, Barney moved to the Philadelphia Navy Yard. On 9 March 1916, she was placed in ordinary at Philadelphia; and, on 21 November, she was decommissioned.

Towed to Charleston, South Carolina, in May 1917, the torpedo boat was recommissioned there on 1 September 1917. Soon thereafter, Barney moved to Norfolk where she served as a patrol vessel in the lower reaches of Chesapeake Bay. On 1 August 1918, her name was changed to Coast Torpedo Boat No. 11 so that the name Barney could be assigned to USS Barney (DD-149). Ordered to the Philadelphia Navy Yard early in 1919, she arrived there on 27 January 1919. On 11 March 1919, the small warship was placed out of commission for the last time. Her name was struck from the Navy list on 28 October 1919 and she was sold to the U.S. Rail and Salvage Company, Newburgh, New York, on 19 July 1920.
