= USS Bagley (TB-24) =

Torpedo boat of the United States Navy

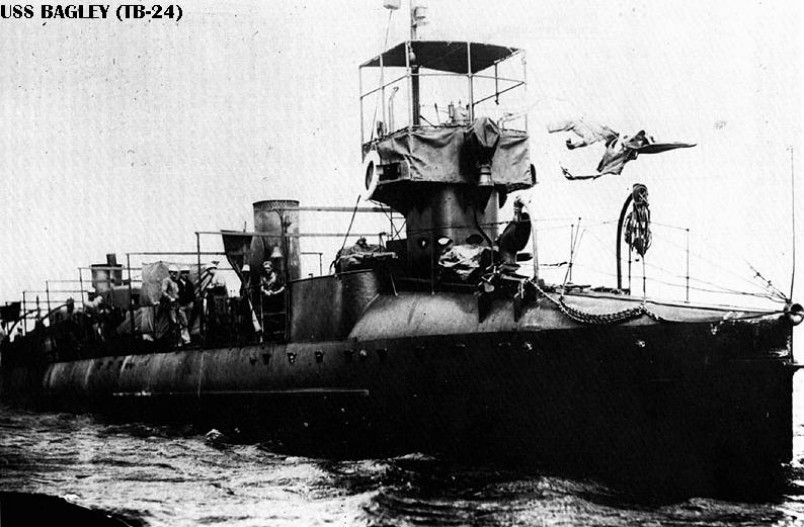
- USS Bagley (TB-24) was the first destroyer-type vessel to carry an aircraft. The aircraft was assembled and tested on a platform (apparently being constructed in this view) abaft the bridge.

History

United States
- Name: Bagley
- Namesake: Ensign Worth Bagley
- Ordered: 4 May 1898 (authorized)
- Builder: Bath Iron Works, Bath, ME
- Laid down: 4 January 1900
- Launched: 25 September 1900
- Sponsored by: Mrs. Josephus Daniels
- Commissioned: 18 October 1901
- Decommissioned: 12 March 1919
- Renamed: Coast Torpedo Boat No. 10, 1 August 1918
- Stricken: 31 March 1919
- Fate: Sold, 9 April 1919

General characteristics
- Class & type: Bagley-class torpedo boat
- Displacement: 175 long tons (178 t)
- Length: 157 ft (48 m)
- Beam: 17 ft 7 in (5.36 m)
- Draft: 4 ft 11 in (1.50 m) (mean)
- Installed power: 2 × Normand boilers; 4,200 ihp (3,100 kW)
- Propulsion: vertical triple expansion engine; 2 × screw propellers
- Speed: 29 knots (54 km/h; 33 mph); 29.15 kn (33.55 mph; 53.99 km/h) (Speed on Trial)
- Complement: 28 officers and enlisted
- Armament: 3 × 1-pounder (37 mm (1.46 in)) guns; 3 × 18 inch (450 mm) torpedo tubes (3x1)
- Aircraft carried: July - August 1910, Butler Ames rotor airplane

USS Bagley (Torpedo Boat No. 24/TB-24/Coast Torpedo Boat No. 10) was a torpedo boat in service with the US Navy between 1898 and 1919, named after Ensign Worth Bagley.

== Service history ==
The first USS Bagley was laid down on 4 January 1900 at Bath, Maine, by the Bath Iron Works; launched on 25 September 1900 and sponsored by Mrs. Josephus Daniels, commissioned at the Boston Navy Yard on 18 October 1901.

By 30 June 1902, Bagley was operating out of the Norfolk Navy Yard. She was placed in commission, in reserve, at Norfolk on 19 February 1903. She remained in the Reserve Torpedo Flotilla at Norfolk until 14 September 1907 when she returned to full commission. Two days later, Bagley began an eight-month tour of duty at Annapolis, Maryland, training US Naval Academy midshipmen. She returned to the Norfolk Navy Yard on 9 June 1908 and the next day was placed back in reserve.

The torpedo boat returned to the Naval Academy sometime between 1 July 1908 and 30 June 1909 and served there until sometime in 1911 when she was placed in reserve at Annapolis. She was placed in ordinary at Annapolis on 13 March 1914. By 30 June 1915, however, she had returned south to the Norfolk Navy Yard. On 29 March 1917, just before America entered World War I, Bagley was returned to full commission. She then moved north to New York where she spent the remainder of the war patrolling New York Harbor. On 1 August 1918, her name was reassigned to Destroyer No. 185 then under construction at Newport News, Virginia, and she became Coast Torpedo Boat No. 10. Retaining that designation for the remainder of her career, she was decommissioned at New York on 12 March 1919. Her name was struck from the Naval Vessel Register on 31 March 1919; and she was sold on 9 April 1919 to Mr. Reinhard Hall, of Brooklyn, New York.
