= William R. Trigg Company =

Coordinates: 37°31′35.29″N 77°25′21.06″W

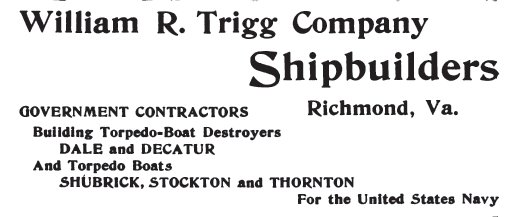
An 1899 advertisement for the company

William R. Trigg Company, also the Trigg Shipbuilding Company, was an inland shipyard in Richmond, Virginia. The shipyard produced torpedo boats and destroyers and the protected cruiser USS Galveston (CL-19) for the United States Navy. It was founded by William R. Trigg, who also owned the Richmond Locomotive Works in 1899. The yard went into receivership and ceased operations by 1903, the same year its founder died.
