= USS Blakely (TB-27) =

Torpedo boat of the United States Navy

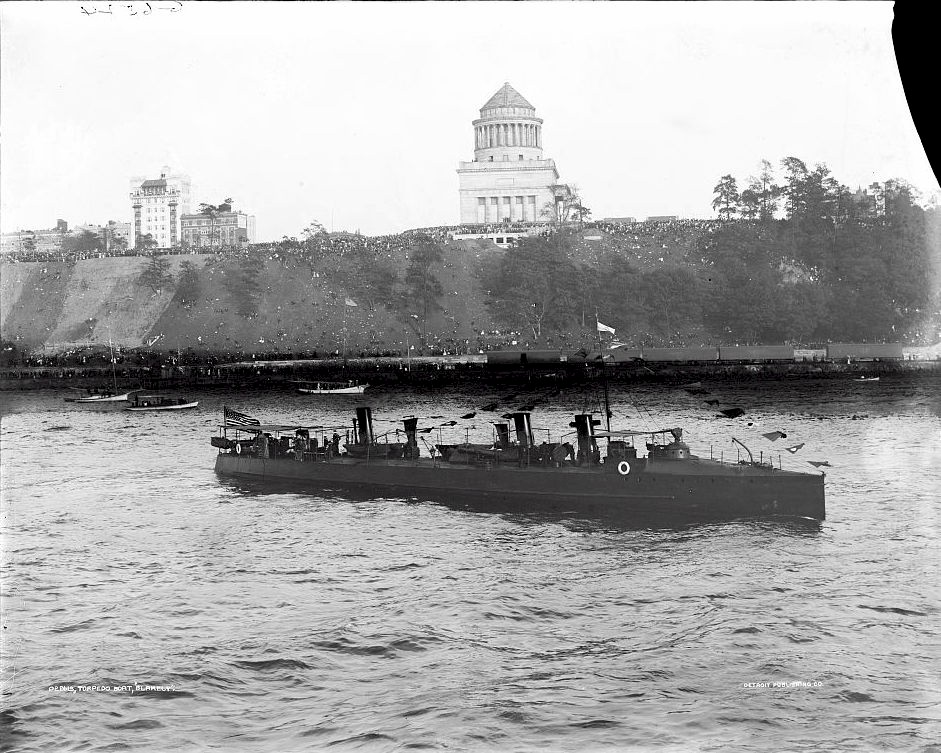
- USS Blakely (TB-27) underway off Grant's Tomb during the 1909 Hudson-Fulton Celebration

History

United States
- Name: Blakely
- Namesake: Johnston Blakeley
- Ordered: 4 May 1898 authorised
- Builder: George Lawley & Son, South Boston, MA
- Laid down: 12 January 1899
- Launched: 22 November 1900
- Commissioned: 27 December 1904
- Decommissioned: 8 March 1919
- Renamed: Coast Torpedo Boat No. 13, 1 August 1918
- Stricken: 31 March 1919
- Fate: Sold, 10 March 1920

General characteristics
- Class & type: Blakely-class torpedo boat
- Displacement: 196 long tons (199 t)
- Length: 175 ft (53 m)
- Beam: 17 ft 8 in (5.38 m)
- Draft: 5 ft 11 in (1.80 m) (mean)
- Installed power: 3 × Normand boilers; 3,000 shp (2,200 kW)
- Propulsion: vertical triple expansion engines; 2 × screw propellers
- Speed: 26 knots (48 km/h; 30 mph); 25.58 knots (47.37 km/h; 29.44 mph) (Speed on Trial)
- Complement: 28 officers and enlisted
- Armament: 3 × 1-pounder gun; 3 × 18-inch (450 mm) torpedo tubes

The first USS Blakely (Torpedo Boat No. 27/TB-27/Coast Torpedo Boat No. 13) was laid down on 12 January 1899 at South Boston, Massachusetts, by George Lawley & Son and launched on 22 November 1900. Sponsored by Miss Nellie M. White; and commissioned on 27 December 1904. It was named for Johnston Blakeley, commander of USS Wasp.

== Built in Massachusetts ==
Blakely completed dock trials at the Boston Navy Yard and then moved to Newport, Rhode Island, where she fitted out with ordnance and electrical equipment at the torpedo station and underwent various tests and inspections.

== Pre-war service with the U.S. Navy ==
Blakely became a unit of the 3rd Torpedo Flotilla, United States Atlantic Fleet. She cruised the Atlantic and gulf coasts of the United States with that organization, engaged in a series of drills, exercises, and port visits. The torpedo boat was placed out of commission, in reserve, at the Norfolk Navy Yard on or about 28 February 1907. She remained inactive until recommissioned on 13 January 1908 and, for about five months, resumed active operations with the 3d Torpedo Flotilla. On 1 July 1908, Blakely returned to inactive status with the Reserve Torpedo Flotilla at Norfolk. At some unspecified point in the succeeding months, she was moved to the New York Navy Yard where she was recommissioned on 6 May 1909. The warship cruised with the Atlantic Torpedo Flotilla for six months. On 9 November 1909, she went back into reserve, this time at Charleston, South Carolina

She remained in reserve, though not necessarily inactive, for a little more than seven years. The first year or so, she spent in Charleston. By 1 July 1911, she had been moved to Newport, Rhode Island, as a unit of the Reserve Torpedo Group. On St. Patrick's Day 1914, this ship, named for a native son of Ireland, was placed in ordinary at the Torpedo Station, Newport, Rhode Island. This suggests that she was assigned to some quasi active duty in support of the Torpedo Station's mission. In May 1916, Blakely, still not in commission, moved to the Naval Station, Narragansett Bay, where she served as a station craft.

== World War I service ==
On 6 April 1917, the day the United States joined the Allies in World War I, Blakely was placed back in commission. Assigned to the Patrol Force and based at New London, Connecticut, she patrolled the waters of the 1st and 2d Naval Districts. In August 1918, her name was canceled and reassigned to a new Wickes-class destroyer then under construction.

== Inactivation ==
For the remainder of her career, the warship was known as Coast Torpedo Boat No. 13. In January 1919, she was ordered to the Philadelphia Navy Yard for inactivation. She was decommissioned for the last time on 8 March 1919, and her name was struck from the Navy list on 7 October 1919. She was sold to the U.S. Rail & Salvage Corp., Newburgh, New York, on 10 March 1920.

== Bibliography ==
- Eger, Christopher L. (March 2021). "Hudson Fulton Celebration, Part II". Warship International. LVIII (1): 58–81. ISSN 0043-0374.
- Sieche, Erwin F. (1990). "Austria-Hungary's Last Visit to the USA". Warship International. XXVII (2): 142–164. ISSN 0043-0374.
- Additional technical data from Gardiner, Robert (1979). Conway's All the World's Fighting Ships 1860–1905. Conway Maritime Press. p. 162. ISBN 0-85177-133-5.
