= 314th Infantry Regiment =

- Active: 1917
- Country: United States
- Branch: U.S. Army Reserve
- Mottos: Fortitude and Courage
- Engagements: World War I World War II

Insignia
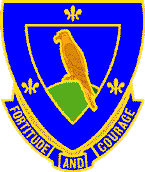
- Distinctive Unit Insignia

The 314th Infantry Regiment is an infantry regiment of the U.S. Army first organized in 1917.

== History ==
=== World War I ===
Organized as part of the 79th Division A.E.F. (American Expeditionary Force) – World War I The United States in World War I, the men of the 314th were trained at Camp Meade (later renamed Fort George G. Meade in 1929), Maryland. Arriving at the camp in September 1917, the unit was included in the 157th Infantry Brigade of Brigadier General William Jones Nicholson, along with the 313th Infantry Regiment and the 311th Machine Gun Battalion. The regiment completed training and sailed to France aboard the USS Leviathan in July 1918. Upon arrival at Brest, France, they continued training until September 1918, then took part in the Meuse Argonne Offensive. Capturing the town of Malancourt on 26 September 1918, they assisted the 313th Infantry on the following day in the capture of the town of Montfaucon-d'Argonne. Montfaucon was a heavily defended area and observation post of the German army. Of the four Infantry regiments of the 79th Division involved in the offensive, the 314th was hardest-hit. It took several days to account for all the missing personnel and bring the regiment up 50 percent manning.

The 79th Division was relieved on 30 September and transferred to the Troyon sector. While there, they assumed a variety of duties, including holding the front. They shared the trenches with the 313th, 315th, and 316th Infantry Regiments. During this time, they were harassed with mustard gas, shelling, and enemy trench and air raids but held the line.

At the end of October, the 79th Division was again ordered to move to participate in the third phase of the Meuse Argonne Offensive. On 1 November 1918, the 314th advanced. By 9 November, they captured the towns of Crepion, Waville, and Moirey. The following day the unit captured Buisson Chaumont, Hill 328. On 11 November, the 314th advanced against Cote de Romagne and stopped firing at 11 a.m., at the time of the Armistice. By the end day, the 314th had made the greatest advance into German lines east of the Meuse River.

The regiment continued training, passed a review by General Pershing, and shipped home on 15 May 1919, aboard the USS Princess Matoika. Arriving at Hoboken, New Jersey on 26 May 1919, they were discharged from service at Camp Dix, New Jersey.

==== History of the Log Cabin ====
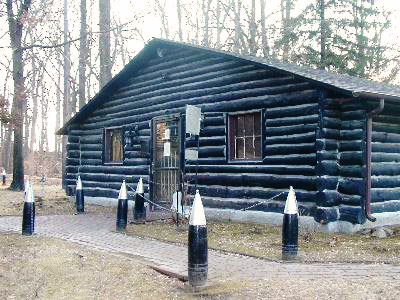

Erected at Camp Meade, Maryland in 1917 by the men of the 314th as an officers' club and assembly room, it was purchased from the U.S. government after the war, carefully disassembled, and rebuilt on ground provided by the Washington Memorial Chapel by members of the Regiment. Dedicated in 1922 by the Veterans of the 314th A.E.F. to honor the 362 men of the regiment who made the supreme sacrifice, the cabin housed artifacts of the 314th which allowed a glimpse at how life was for the men during the First World War. The centerpiece of the cabin was a bronze tablet listing all the members of the regiment—more than 4,000 names. A star was placed beside each name upon their death as a sign of honor. In 2012, the cabin was disassembled, gifted to the U.S. Army, and returned to Fort George G. Meade. It remains in storage, currently awaiting reconstruction. The contents of the cabin were donated to the Fort Meade Museum. As of 2024, the cabin is being reconstructed at the 29th Infantry Division Museum, 566 Lee Highway, Verona, Virginia, and will be available for viewing by late 2025.

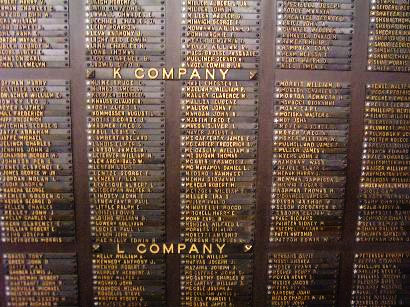

314th Infantry Regiment A.E.F. website

=== Interwar period ===
Pursuant to the National Defense Act of 1920, the 314th Infantry was reconstituted in the Organized Reserve on 24 June 1921, assigned to the 79th Division, and allotted to the Third Corps Area. The regiment was initiated on 22 October 1921 with headquarters at Reading. Subordinate battalion headquarters concurrently organized as follows: 1st Battalion at Allentown; 2nd Battalion at Reading; and 3rd Battalion at Harrisburg. The regiment typically conducted its inactive training period meetings at locations as follows: 126 North 5th Street in Reading; the American Legion Hall in Harrisburg; the Post Office Building in Allentown; and the National Guard armory in Lebanon. The regiment conducted summer training most years with the 12th and 34th Infantry Regiments at Fort George G. Meade, and some years at Fort Washington, Maryland, or Fort Eustis, Virginia, and also conducted infantry CMTC training some years at Fort Meade or Fort Eustis as an alternate form of summer training. The regiment provided a number of officers to the Pennsylvania National Guard's 28th Division for the 1939 and 1940 First Army maneuvers. The primary ROTC "feeder" schools for new Reserve lieutenants for the 314th were the Pennsylvania Military College, Gettysburg College, and Lehigh University.

=== Regular (Active) Army (1999-Present) ===
17 October 1999, the 314th Infantry was withdrawn from the Combat Arms Regimental System and designated the 314th Regiment, consisting of the 1st, 2nd, and 3rd Battalions. These three Battalions were concurrently allotted to the Regular Army.

The three Battalions of the 314th Regiment were assigned to the 78th Division (Training Support), operating out of Fort Drum, NY. 1 October 2002, the Regiment was reorganized into the 1st and 3rd Battalions.

2 October 2009, 1st and 3rd Battalions concurrently relieved from assignment to the 78th Division (Training Support) and assigned to First Army, moving to Fort Dix, NJ.

== Lineage ==
- Constituted 5 August 1917 in the National Army (USA) as the 314th Infantry and assigned to the 79th Division
- Organized in August 1917 at Camp Meade, Maryland
- Demobilized 29 May 1919 at Camp Dix, New Jersey
- Reconstituted 24 June 1921 in the Organized Reserves as the 314th Infantry and assigned to the 79th Division (later redesignated as the 79th Infantry Division)
- Organized in November 1921 with headquarters at Reading, Pennsylvania
- Ordered into active military service 15 June 1942 and reorganized at Camp Pickett, Virginia
- Inactivated 15 December 1945 at Camp Kilmer, New Jersey
- Activated 2 January 1947 in the Organized Reserves with headquarters at Pittsburgh, Pennsylvania
- (Organized Reserves redesignated 25 March 1948 as the Organized Reserve Corps; redesignated 9 July 1952 as the Army Reserve)
- Reorganized 6 April 1959 as a parent regiment under the Combat Arms Regimental System to consist of the 1st Battle Group, an element of the 79th Infantry Division
- Reorganized 7 January 1963 to consist of the 1st Battalion, an element of the 157th Infantry Brigade
- 1st Battalion inactivated 1 September 1995 and relieved from assignment to the 157th Infantry Brigade
- 314th Infantry withdrawn 17 October 1999 from the Combat Arms Regimental System(Training Support); 1st, 2d, and 3d Battalions concurrently allotted to the Regular Army
- Reorganized 1 October 2002 to consist of the 1st and 3d Battalions, elements of the 78th Division (Training Support)
- Regiment reorganized 2 October 2009 as a parent regiment under the United States Army Regimental System; 1st and 3d Battalions concurrently relieved from assignment to the 78th Division (Training Support)

== Distinctive unit insignia ==
- Description

A gold color metal and enamel device 1 1/8 inches (2.9 cm) in height overall consisting of a shield blazoned: Azure upon a mount Proper a falcon close Or within an orle of the last, in bordure three fleurs-de-lis of the like. Attached below the shield a Blue scroll inscribed "FORTITUDE AND COURAGE" in Gold letters.

- Symbolism

The 314th Infantry was organized at Camp Meade as a unit of the 79th Division in 1917. It served overseas during World War I and took part in the Meuse-Argonne operation and held a sector in Lorraine. Under authority of the National Defense Act the regiment was reconstituted a unit of the 79th Division, Organized Reserves, in November 1921, with headquarters at Reading, Pennsylvania. The falcon recalls Montfaucon and the three fleurs-de-lis recall the regiment's first service in the Meuse-Argonne, the Troyon Sector and the second service in the Meuse-Argonne.

- Background

The distinctive unit insignia was originally approved for the 314th Infantry, Organized Reserves on 14 July 1924. It was amended to revise the symbolism of the design on 22 June 1970. On 3 September 1999 the insignia was redesignated with description updated for the 314th Regiment.

== Coat of arms ==
=== Blazon ===
- Shield

Azure upon a mount Proper a falcon close Or within an orle of the last in bordure three fleurs-de-lis of the like.

- Crest

That for the regiments and separate battalions of the Army Reserve: From a wreath Or and Azure, the Lexington Minute Man Proper. The statue of the Minute Man, Captain John Parker (H.H. Kitson, sculptor), stands on the common in Lexington, Massachusetts. Motto Fortitude and Courage.

=== Symbolism ===
- Shield

The 314th Infantry was organized at Camp Meade as a unit of the 79th Division in 1917. It served overseas during World War I and took part in the Meuse-Argonne operation and held a sector in Lorraine. Under authority of the National Defense Act the regiment was reconstituted a unit of the 79th Division, Organized Reserves, in November 1921, with headquarters at Reading, Pennsylvania. The falcon recalls Montfaucon and the three fleurs-de-lis recall the regiment's first service in the Meuse-Argonne, the Troyon Sector and the second service in the Meuse-Argonne.

- Crest

The crest is that of the U.S. Army Reserve.

=== Background ===
The coat of arms was originally approved for the 314th Infantry, Organized Reserves on 2 May 1924. It was amended to withdraw the "Organized Reserves" from the designation and to delete the Organized Reserves' crest from the coat of arms for the 314th Infantry on 29 May 1959. On 22 June 1970 it was amended to reinstate the crest of the Army Reserve and revise the symbolism of the design. On 3 September 1999 the coat of arms was redesignated for the 314th Regiment.

== Campaign participation credit ==
- World War I: Meuse-Argonne; Lorraine 1918
- World War II: Normandy; Northern France; Rhineland; Ardennes-Alsace; Central Europe

== Decorations ==
- French Croix de Guerre with Palm, World War II for NORMANDY TO PARIS
- French Croix de Guerre with Palm, World War II for PARROY FOREST
- French Fourragère in the colors of the Croix de Guerre, World War II
  - 1st Battalion additionally entitled to:
- Presidential Unit Citation (Army) for LA HAYE DU PUITS
- Army Superior Unit Award, Streamer embroidered 2008–2011
  - 2d Battalion additionally entitled to:
- Presidential Unit Citation (Army) for FORT DU ROULE
  - 3d Battalion additionally entitled to:
- Presidential Unit Citation (Army) for MEURTHE RIVER
- Army Superior Unit Award, Streamer embroidered 2008–2011

== Notable members ==
- Cliff Aberson, Company L in World War II

== Sources ==
- The 314th Infantry Regiment 79th Division Vol. I and Vol. II. – compiled by Roy Rentz.
- History of the 79th Division, A.E.F. – published by Steinman and Steinman, Lancaster, PA.
- American Armies And Battlefields in Europe – by Center of Military History-United States Army.
- 79th Division-Summary of Operations in World War One – by The American Battle Monuments Commission.
- army.mil
