= USS Farragut (TB-11) =

Torpedo boat of the United States Navy

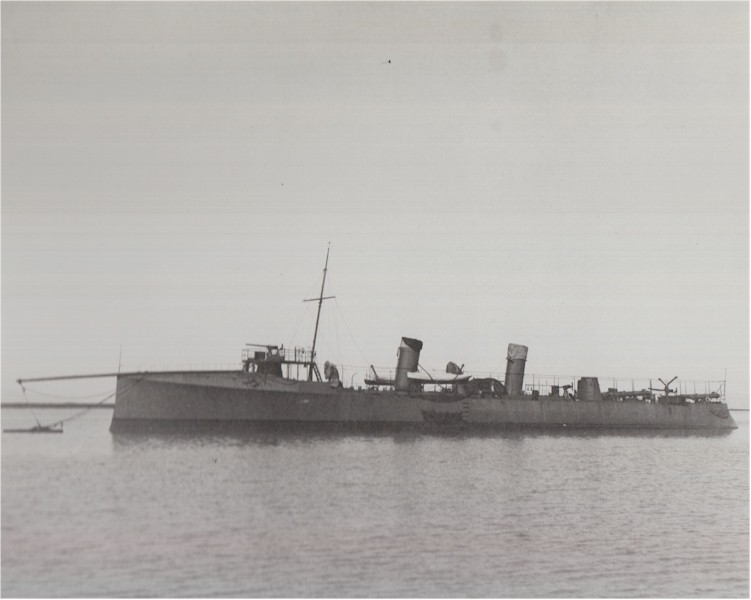
- USS Farragut (TB-11) off Mare Island Navy Yard circa 1899.

History

United States
- Name: Farragut
- Namesake: Admiral David Farragut
- Ordered: 10 June 1896 (authorized)
- Builder: Union Iron Works, San Francisco, CA
- Laid down: 26 July 1897
- Launched: 16 July 1898
- Sponsored by: Elizabeth Ashe, Admiral Farragut's niece
- Commissioned: 22 March 1899
- Decommissioned: 13 March 1919
- Renamed: Coast Torpedo Boat No. 5, 1 August 1918
- Identification: TB-11
- Fate: Sold, 9 September 1919

General characteristics
- Class & type: Farragut-class torpedo boat
- Displacement: 279 long tons (283 t)
- Length: 214 ft (65 m)
- Beam: 20 ft 8 in (6.30 m)
- Draft: 6 ft 10 in (2.08 m) (mean)
- Installed power: 3 × Thornycroft boilers; 5,878 ihp (4,383 kW)
- Propulsion: vertical triple expansion engines; 2 × screw propellers
- Speed: 30 knots (56 km/h; 35 mph); 30.13 kn (34.67 mph; 55.80 km/h) (Speed on Trial)
- Complement: 66 officers and enlisted
- Armament: 4 × 6-pounder (57 mm (2.24 in)) guns; 2 × 18 inch (450 mm) torpedo tubes (2x1)

The first USS Farragut (Torpedo Boat No. 11/TB-11/Coast Torpedo Boat No. 5) was a torpedo boat in the United States Navy. She was named for David Farragut, commander-in-chief of the U.S. Navy during the American Civil War.

== History ==
Farragut was launched 16 July 1898 by Union Iron Works, San Francisco, California; sponsored by Miss Elizabeth Ashe, Admiral Farragut's niece; and commissioned 5 June 1899, Lieutenant Commander Reginald F. Nicholson in command.

Farragut's first operations were between Mare Island and Sausalito in San Francisco Bay, and occasionally south to San Diego, California, in target and torpedo practice. She was decommissioned at the Mare Island Navy Yard 4 September 1902; in commission in reserve from 8 October 1904; and restored to full commission 28 March 1908 for duty with the Pacific Torpedo Fleet.

She resumed her operations along the coast of California aside from 30 May to 10 June 1908, when she sailed to visit Portland, Oregon. Farragut was placed in reserve 18 September 1909 and recommissioned 10 May 1911, again for service in the San Francisco area aside from a cruise to Bremerton, Washington, that summer. Once more, on 1 July 1912, she went into reserve, and then on 26 March 1914, into ordinary.

Between 12 January 1915 and 14 April 1917, Farragut was assigned to the San Pedro Division of the California Naval Militia as a training ship. Returning then to full commission, Farragut sailed for the Panama Canal Zone 11 July 1917, and for the remainder of World War I, patrolled both the Atlantic and Pacific entrances to the Panama Canal, and carried troops and supplies in the Balboa area.

Renamed Coast Torpedo Boat No. 5 on 1 August 1918, she completed her service in the Canal Zone 30 December, and arrived at the Mare Island Navy Yard 18 January 1919. There she was decommissioned 13 March 1919 and sold 9 September 1919.

SS Admiral Farrgut at sea
