= Reginald F. Nicholson =

United States Navy admiral (1852–1939)

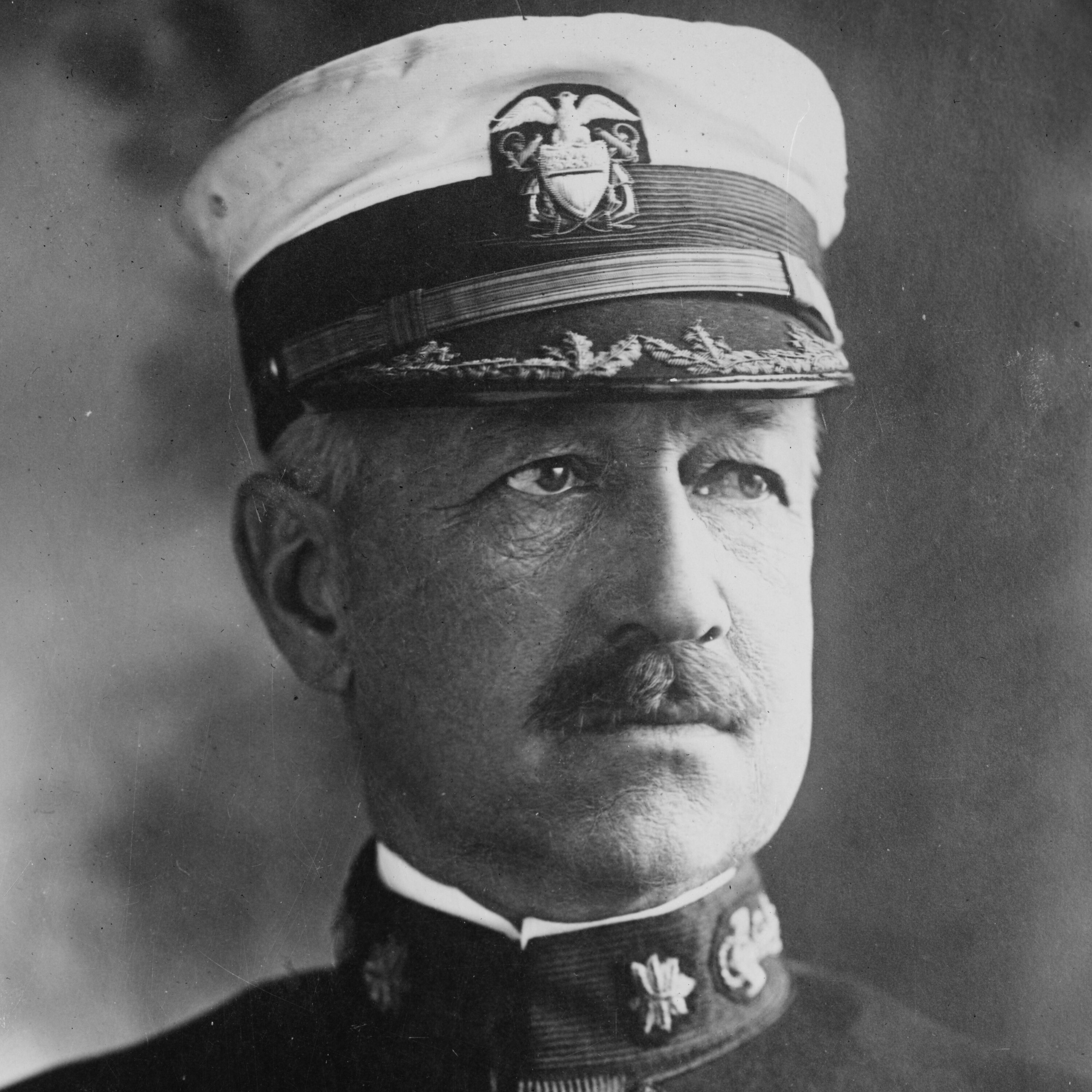
- Born: 15 December 1852; Washington, D.C., U.S.
- Died: 19 December 1939 (aged 87); Bethesda, Maryland, U.S.
- Burial place: Arlington National Cemetery, Arlington, Virginia
- Relatives: William J. Nicholson (brother)
- Military career
- Allegiance: United States of America
- Branch: United States Navy
- Service years: 1864; 1873–1914; 1917–1919
- Rank: Rear Admiral
- Nicknames: "Reggie", "Edgy Reggie"
- Commands: USS Rowan (TB-8); USS Farragut (TB-11); USS Tacoma (CL-20); USS Nebraska (BB-14); Yangtze Patrol; United States Asiatic Fleet
- Conflicts: American Civil War; Union Blockade; Spanish–American War; Battle of Santiago de Cuba; World War I

Rear Admiral Reginald Fairfax Nicholson (15 December 1852 – 19 December 1939) was an officer in the United States Navy. He fought in the American Civil War and Spanish–American War, was Commander-in-Chief of the United States Asiatic Fleet, and came out of retirement during World War I to serve as the first U.S. naval attaché to Ecuador and Peru. He retired as the last active-duty U.S. Navy officer to have served in the American Civil War.

== Naval career ==
Nicholson was born in Washington, D.C., on 15 December 1852, the son of U.S. Navy Commodore Somerville Nicholson (1822–1905) and the former Hannah Maria Jones (1837–1897). His siblings included William Jones Nicholson, a brigadier general in the United States Army. His first U.S. Navy service came in 1864, when at the age of 12 he left school to enlist in the Navy as an orderly for his father, who was the commanding officer of the steamer USS State of Georgia, then operating as part of the Union blockade of the Confederate States of America during the American Civil War. While Nicholson was aboard State of Georgia, the ship blockaded Wilmington, North Carolina, and fought engagements with Confederate fortifications guarding the city. After 30 days, Nicholson left the ship and returned to school.

On 30 September 1869, Nicholson was appointed from the District of Columbia as a midshipman and entered the United States Naval Academy in Annapolis, Maryland. He graduated on 31 May 1873 with the rank of midshipman.

Nicholson's first assignment was to the signals office in 1873. Promoted to ensign on 16 July 1874, he served aboard the sidewheel steam frigate USS Powhatan in the North Atlantic Squadron from 1875 to 1877. He then had ordnance duty at the Washington Navy Yard in Washington, D.C., from 1877 to 1878.

From 1878 to 1882, Nicholson was aboard the sloop-of-war USS Portsmouth, then serving as a training ship, and was promoted to master on 22 January 1880. He then performed duty at the United States Hydrographic Office from 1882 to 1885, being promoted while there to lieutenant, junior grade, on 3 March 1883. He returned to sea aboard the new steam sloop-of-war USS Mohican in the Pacific Squadron from 1885 to 1888, and was promoted to lieutenant on 17 January 1886. After leaving Mohican, he reported to the Washington Navy Yard for another tour of ordnance duty in 1888.

Nicholson was assigned to the new monitor USS Monterey in February 1893, and to the steamer USS Thetis in January 1895. He returned to the Washington Navy Yard for a third tour there in December 1895.

In December 1897, Nicholson reported for duty aboard the battleship USS Oregon, and he served as her chief navigation officer during her spectacular voyage from the United States West Coast around Cape Horn to Cuba at the outset of the Spanish–American War in 1898. On 1 October 1898, he was assigned to the new torpedo boat USS Farragut, then fitting out. Promoted to lieutenant commander on 3 March 1899, he became the first commanding officer of the new torpedo boat USS Rowan on 1 April 1899, then took command of Farragut when she was commissioned on 5 June 1899. He remained in command of Farragut until 1901.

Nicholson next served in the Bureau of Navigation and was promoted to commander on 17 September 1902. In 1903 he was assigned to the new protected cruiser USS Tacoma, then under construction at Union Iron Works in Mare Island, California, and became her first commanding officer when she was commissioned on 30 January 1904, remaining aboard her until December 1905. He began another tour of duty in the Bureau of Navigation on 22 June 1906, remaining there into 1907. He was promoted to captain on 1 July 1907.

Nicholson took command of the battleship USS Nebraska in 1907 and commanded her during Nebraska's participation in the 1907–1909 round-the-world cruise of the U.S. Navy's Great White Fleet, which she joined in May 1908. After the conclusion of the voyage in 1909, President William Howard Taft appointed him on 1 December 1909 for a four-year tour as Chief of the Bureau of Navigation in Washington, D.C.

Nicholson was promoted to rear admiral on 19 May 1911. In mid-1911, he was chosen to end his tour at the Bureau of Navigation early and succeed Rear Admiral Joseph B. Murdock as commander-in-chief of the U.S. Asiatic Fleet as of November 1911, but United States Secretary of State Philander C. Knox requested that Murdock be kept on as fleet commander to allow continuity during unrest in China related to the Xinhai Revolution of that year. Meanwhile, United States Secretary of the Navy George von Lengerke Meyer had already selected Nicholson's successor as Chief of the Bureau of Navigation. President Taft explained the situation to Nicholson, who was dispatched to the Asiatic Fleet to command its Yangtze Patrol. In February 1912, with the Chinese crisis having abated, it was again proposed that Nicholson succeed Murdock, but Knox again asked that Murdock stay on as fleet commander-in-chief. On 20 July 1912, Nicholson finally received orders to take command of the fleet, and he relieved Murdock on 24 July 1912.

Relinquishing command of the Asiatic Fleet on 3 May 1914, Nicholson became a member of the General Board of the United States Navy until he retired from the Navy upon reaching the statutory retirement age of 62 on 15 December 1914. At the time, he was the last U.S. Navy officer on active duty to have seen service in the American Civil War.

When the United States entered World War I in April 1917, Nicholson was recalled to active duty. He headed a naval mission to Chile and served as the first American naval attaché to Ecuador and Peru from 7 November 1917 to 25 November 1919 before returning to retirement.

== Personal life ==
Nicholson's first wife was the former Annie Ellen Heap (1855–1889), whom he married on 7 July 1877. They had two children, Mary Jane Nicholson Durell (1878–1962) and Reginald Fairfax Nicholson (1879–1890). After the death of his first wife, Nicholson married the former Elizabeth Code (26 July 1877 – 20 September 1955) on 2 June 1900.

== Death ==
Nicholson died of a heart attack at the National Naval Medical Center in Bethesda, Maryland, on 19 December 1939. He is buried with his second wife at Arlington National Cemetery in Arlington, Virginia.

== Commemoration ==
It was reported in January 1918 that after purchasing the steamer Northland, the Pacific Steamship Company had renamed her Admiral Nicholson in honor of Nicholson.

== Gallery ==
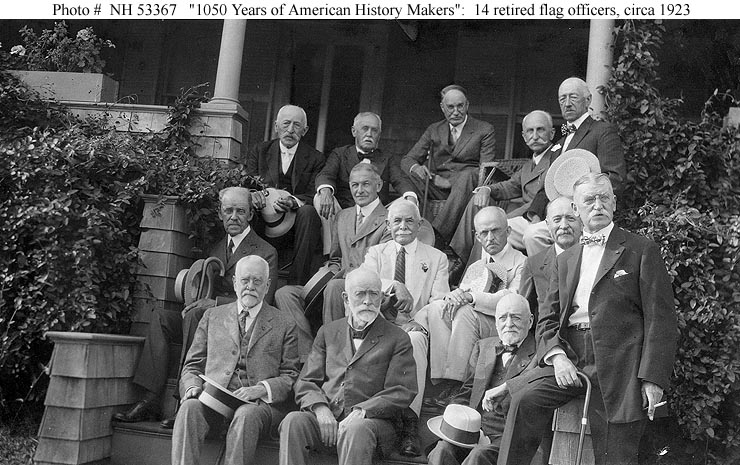
Nicholson is on the right in the back row in this photograph of 13 retired United States Navy rear admirals and one retired United States Marine Corps major general taken c. 1923.

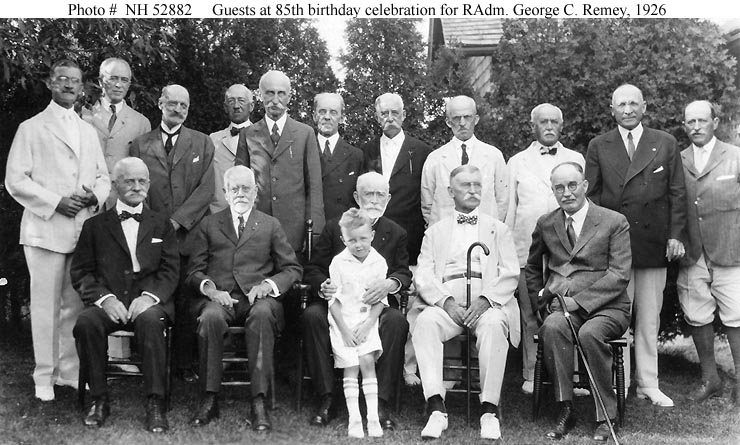
Nicholson is standing fourth from left in this photo of retired flag officers taken at the 85th birthday party of Rear Admiral George C. Remey on 10 August 1926.

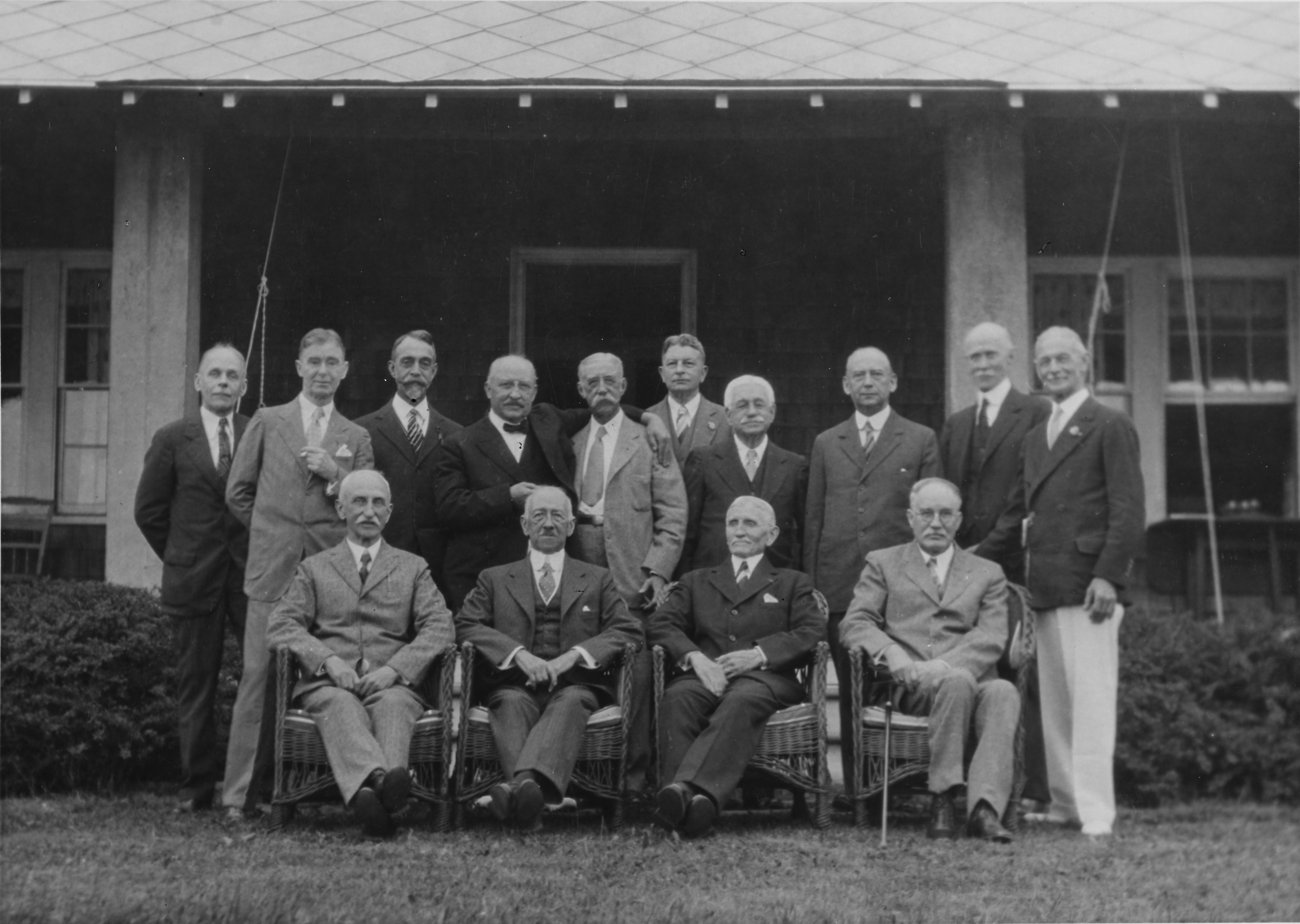
Nicholson is seated second from left in this 7 August 1928 photograph of retired U.S. Navy rear admirals and other retirees at Rear Admiral Spencer S. Wood's home in Jamestown, Rhode Island.

== See also ==
Military offices
| Preceded by Joseph B. Murdock | Commander-in-Chief, United States Asiatic Fleet; 24 July 1912 – 3 May 1914 | Succeeded by Walter C. Cowles |
