= William Jones Nicholson =

United States Army general (1856–1931)

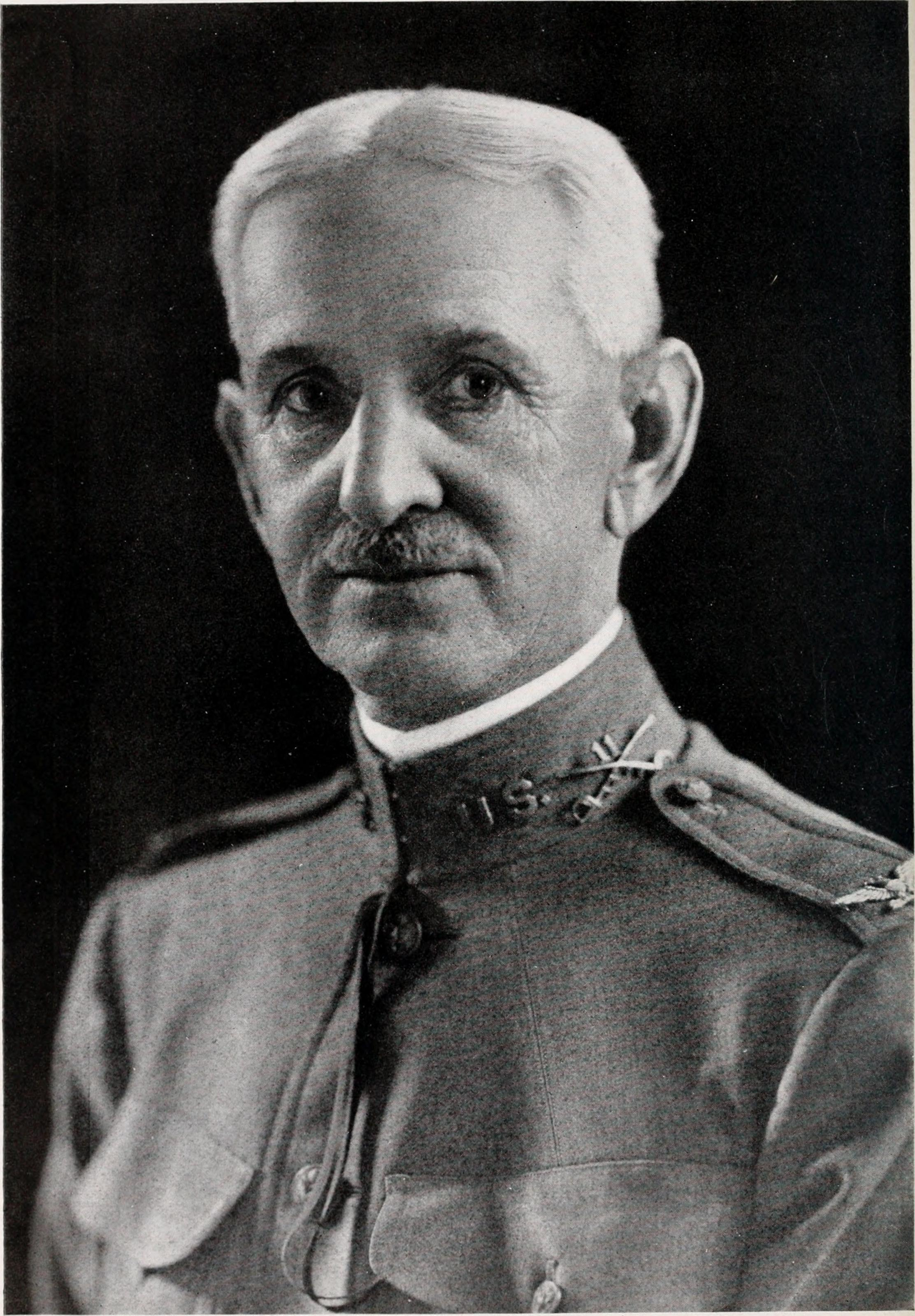
- From 1920's The History and Achievements of the Fort Sheridan Officers' Training Camps
- Born: January 16, 1856; Washington, D.C., U.S.
- Died: December 20, 1931 (aged 75); Washington, D.C., U.S.
- Burial place: Arlington National Cemetery
- Spouse: Harriet Fenlon (m. 1883–1931, his death)
- Children: 2
- Relatives: Reginald F. Nicholson (brother)
- Military career
- Allegiance: United States of America
- Branch: United States Army
- Service years: 1876–1920
- Rank: Brigadier General
- Nicknames: Slicker Bill; Nick
- Unit: United States Army Cavalry Branch
- Commands: Troop C, 7th Cavalry Regiment; 1st Squadron, 7th Cavalry Regiment; 2nd Cavalry Regiment; Citizens' Military Training Camp, Fort Sheridan, Illinois; 5th Cavalry Regiment; 11th Cavalry Regiment; Officer Candidate School, Fort Sheridan, Illinois; 157th Infantry Brigade; 79th Division; 152nd Depot Brigade
- Conflicts: American Indian Wars; Spanish–American War; Philippine–American War; Pancho Villa Expedition; World War I
- Awards: Distinguished Service Cross; Distinguished Service Medal; Silver Star; Legion of Honor (Officer) (France); Croix de Guerre (France)
- Other work: President, Army and Navy Club of America

William Jones Nicholson (January 16, 1856 – December 20, 1931) was a career officer in the United States Army. He attained the rank of brigadier general during World War I as commander of the 157th Infantry Brigade, a unit of the 79th Division. He was most notable for leading his brigade to victory during the September 1918 Battle of Montfaucon, part of the first phase of the Meuse-Argonne Offensive, for which he received the Distinguished Service Cross.

A native of Washington, D.C., and the son of a career United States Navy officer, Nicholson was educated in Washington and in 1876 successfully applied for a commission as a second lieutenant in the United States Army. He served primarily with the 7th Cavalry Regiment, and advanced through the ranks to command the regiment's 1st Squadron, and later the 2nd Cavalry Regiment, 5th Cavalry Regiment, and 11th Cavalry Regiment. Nicholson was a veteran of the American Indian Wars (including the 1890 Wounded Knee Massacre), Spanish–American War, Philippine–American War, and Pancho Villa Expedition. He was temporarily promoted to brigadier general for World War I and commanded the 157th Infantry Brigade. Nicholson led his brigade during the capture of Montfaucon, and continued in command during subsequent fighting. After the war, he commanded the 152nd Depot Brigade, where he oversaw the demobilization and discharge of soldiers returning home after the Armistice.

Nicholson retired as a colonel in 1920 and resided in Washington, D.C. In 1927, he was restored to the rank of brigadier general on the Army's retired list. He died in Washington on December 20, 1931, and was buried at Arlington National Cemetery.

== Early life ==
William Jones Nicholson was born in Washington, D.C., on January 16, 1856, a child of Somerville Jones Nicholson (1822–1905), a career United States Navy officer, and Hannah Maria (Jones) Nicholson (1837–1897). His siblings included Reginald F. Nicholson, who attained the rank of rear admiral in the Navy and was a veteran of both the American Civil War and World War I.

William Nicholson attended the schools of Washington, D.C., and Georgetown Preparatory School. With the 7th Cavalry Regiment's officer corps depleted by the June 1876 Battle of the Little Bighorn, the organization moved quickly to replenish the ranks of its lieutenants and captains. Nicholson successfully requested an appointment as a second lieutenant later that year. His application was aided by endorsements from family and social connections, including John B. Blake, the Secretary of the Washington National Monument Society, and William Wilson Corcoran, who was related to his mother's family.

In August 1876, Nicholson was commissioned in the 7th Cavalry directly from civilian life and reported to the Cavalry depot near St. Louis, Missouri for his initial training and to take charge of a group of recruits bound for Fort Abraham Lincoln. He was initially assigned to the 7th Cavalry's Troop B.

== Start of career ==
Nicholson initially performed frontier duty with the 7th Cavalry's Troops B, G and M during the American Indian Wars and was assigned to posts including Fort Meade, Fort Abraham Lincoln, and Fort Leavenworth. He took part in the final stages of the Little Bighorn Campaign, including the Battle of Canyon Creek against the Nez Perce Indians in September 1877. Nicholson's Troop G was part of an ad hoc battalion commanded by Frederick Benteen, and soldiers of the 1st Cavalry Regiment witnessed the heroism of Nicholson and two other lieutenants as they led mounted charges during the fighting, which led to Benteen commending them by name in his official report.

In 1879, Major Marcus Reno was accused of several crimes and incidents of misconduct, including drunkenly assaulting Nicholson with a pool cue during a game in a public billiard hall at Fort Meade, causing injuries to Nicholson. Nicholson preferred charges, and in April 1880, Reno was convicted of conduct prejudicial to good order and discipline for his assault on Nicholson and other offenses. He was sentenced to dismissal from the service.

Nicholson was a noted horseman and during his career he took part in numerous equestrian activities, including stakes races, polo matches, and horse shows. In 1883, Nicholson graduated from the Infantry and Cavalry School. In January 1884, he was promoted to first lieutenant in the 7th Cavalry's Troop M. From 1884 to 1887, he served as professor of military science and tactics at Kansas State University.

In October 1888, Nicholson was assigned to Troop G and was part of a 7th Cavalry contingent that marched from Fort Riley to Topeka, Kansas to participate in festivities at a week long reunion of Grand Army of the Republic members and members of the Military Order of the Loyal Legion of the United States. Afterward, Nicholson returned to Troop M, and in August 1890, he was assigned to Troop I.

In December 1890, Nicholson was serving as adjutant of the 7th Cavalry's 1st Squadron, commanded by Samuel Whitside. In this capacity, he took part in the military action against the Lakota people that led to the Wounded Knee Massacre. Nicholson testified at the 1891 military inquiry headed by Nelson A. Miles and stated that he observed Troops B and K engage Lakota warriors after the warriors fired at the soldiers, but that the soldiers had made every possible effort to spare women and children. He was later assigned to Troop D, and in 1893 Nicholson was transferred to Troop H.

In 1896, Nicholson was serving as the 7th Cavalry's regimental adjutant when he was promoted to captain and assigned to command Troop C. In 1897, Nicholson commanded Troop C during frontier duty at Fort Grant, Arizona.

== Spanish–American War ==
During the Spanish–American War, Nicholson initially commanded Troop C, 7th Cavalry. In June 1898, Nicholson was appointed as mustering officer for troops from Maryland and Virginia. Based at Fort Monroe, he was responsible for enrolling National Guard members and civilians who volunteered for army service. He was promoted to temporary major in July 1898 and attached as ordnance officer on the staff of 2nd Division, First Army Corps. In October 1898, Nicholson was assigned as chief mustering officer for the state of Kentucky.

In early 1899, Nicholson commanded Troop C, 7th Cavalry during service at Pinar del Rio, Cuba. In March, he was appointed US Indian Agent at the San Carlos Apache Indian Reservation in Arizona and reverted to his permanent rank of captain. During his tenure, Nicholson took steps to curb the grazing of herds on Indian land without permission, a practice in which many white Arizonans were involved.

== Continued career ==
Nicholson was transferred to the 12th Cavalry Regiment in 1901. He served in Batangas and Cabanatuan during the Philippine–American War and was promoted to the permanent rank of major in 1904. Later that year, he returned to the 7th Cavalry and was stationed at Camp George H. Thomas, Georgia. In 1905, Nicholson was the chief inspector and advisor for the Pennsylvania National Guard. From 1906 to 1907 he served with the Philippine Division as a member of the Department of Luzon's staff, where he performed staff duties including adjutant, signal officer, and surveying officer. From 1907 to 1911, Nicholson commanded 1st Squadron, 7th Cavalry, based at Fort Riley, Kansas.

In 1911, Nicholson was promoted to lieutenant colonel, and from 1911 to 1912 he served as surveying officer on the staff of the Department of Luzon. Nicholson was promoted to colonel in September 1912. From November 1913 to February 1915, Nicholson was commander of the 2nd Cavalry Regiment, based at Fort Ethan Allen, Vermont.

From 1915 to 1916, Nicholson planned and organized the instruction of military-minded civilians as commander of the Citizens' Military Training Camp at Fort Sheridan, Illinois. In 1916 and 1917, he commanded first the 5th Cavalry Regiment, and later the 11th Cavalry Regiment, during their participation in the Pancho Villa Expedition. In the spring of 1917, Nicholson supervised cavalry instruction for noncommissioned officer schools, officer candidate schools, and Organized Reserve Corps schools in Texas. In the summer of 1917, Nicholson commanded the Officer Candidate School at Fort Sheridan.

== World War I ==
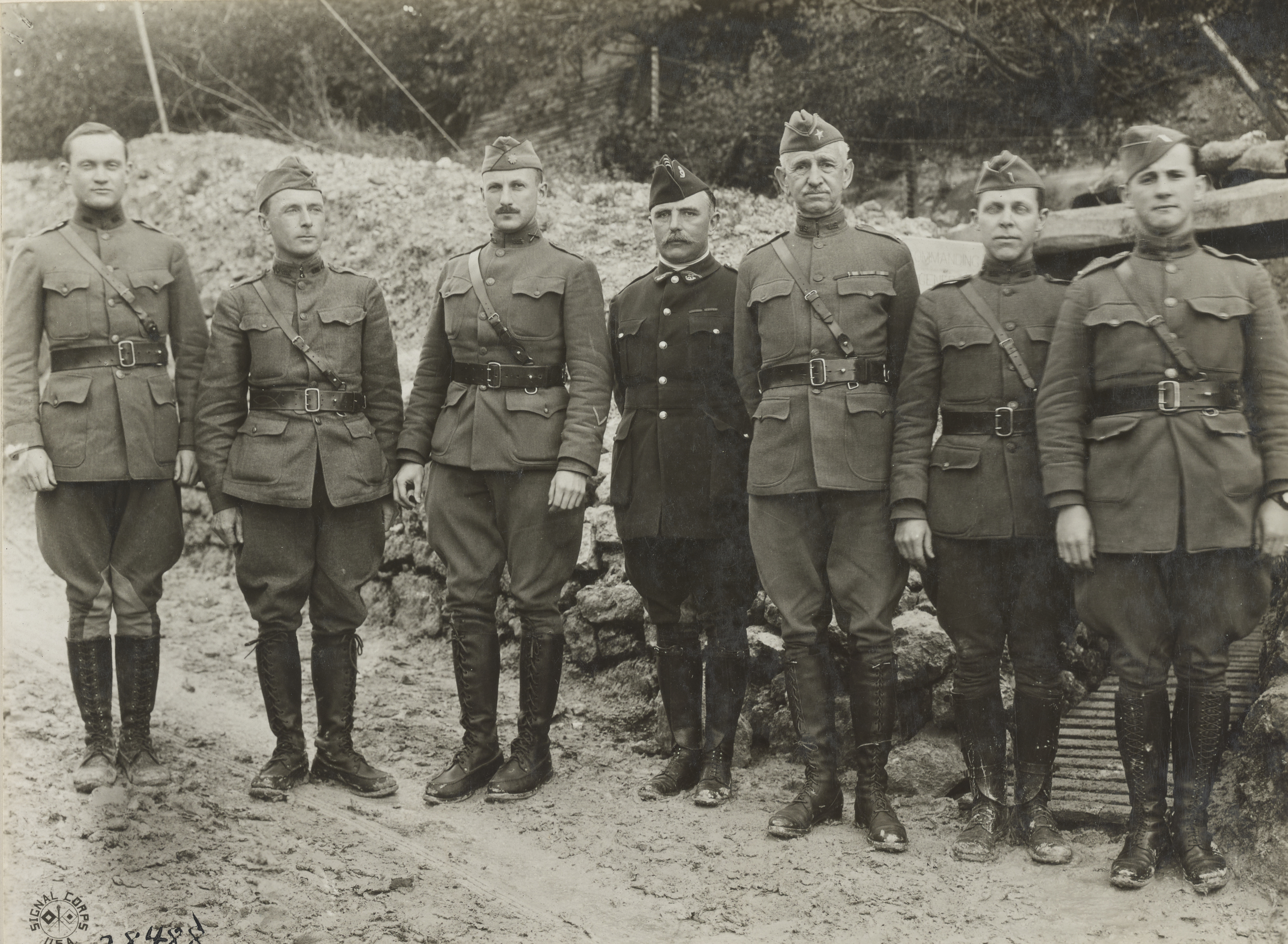
Nicholson poses with members of his 157th Brigade staff in France, October 1918.

With the army expanding for American entry into World War I, on August 5, 1917, Nicholson was promoted to brigadier general in the National Army and assigned to command the 157th Brigade, a unit of the 79th Division, commanded by Major General Joseph E. Kuhn. The brigade included the 313th and 314th Infantry Regiments, as well as the 311th Machine Gun Battalion, and it completed its initial organization and training at Camp Meade, Maryland.

The brigade arrived in France in July 1918 and completed additional training before entering combat in September. During the Meuse-Argonne Offensive, Nicholson’s unit was tasked with capturing a key terrain feature, Montfaucon. During the battle, Nicholson's brigade command post staff lost contact with the 79th Division headquarters, so Nicholson continued pressing the attack on his own initiative. When the brigade staff lost contact with the 314th Infantry’s headquarters, Nicholson opted to stay on the offensive with the 313th Infantry. During the fighting, Nicholson personally located and traveled on horseback to the 79th Division's headquarters to arrange for artillery support to the 313th Infantry. As he returned to his brigade command post, it came under attack from German machine guns and artillery. Nicholson remounted his horse and road forward to his brigade headquarters, where he issued orders to continue the attack on Montfaucon, directed his staff's planning, supervised unit preparations, and then led the renewed action that finally captured the objective. For his heroism and leadership while under fire, Nicholson received the Distinguished Service Cross.

After the Montfaucon battle, Nicholson's brigade was moved to the Troyon sector. After reorganizing and reequipping, the division prepared to reenter combat near Verdun. Upon arrival in late October, the 79th Division relieved the 26th Division and assumed its place in the front line. The 79th Division resumed the offensive in early November and was still engaged in offensive operations on November 11, 1918, when the armistice with Germany caused the end of hostilities.

At age 62, Nicholson was the oldest American soldier known to have seen combat during World War I – the few generals older than him, including Hugh L. Scott, Tasker H. Bliss and William Abram Mann, served in training, staff, and administrative roles. Nicholson was acting commander of the 79th Division on several occasions in 1917 and 1918. These dates included November 26, 1917, to February 16, 1918; April 15, 1918; May 22 to June 7, 1918; and June 28 to July 22, 1918.

== Later career ==
On his return to the United States, Nicholson commanded the 152nd Depot Brigade at Camp Upton, New York where he oversaw the demobilization and discharge of soldiers returning from France. In January 1920, he reached the mandatory retirement age of 64 and retired at his permanent rank of colonel. At the time of his retirement, Nicholson's 43 years and six months in uniform made him the Army's most senior officer with respect to time in service.

== Retirement and death ==
In retirement, Nicholson was a resident of Washington, D.C. In September 1920, he was elected president of the Army and Navy Club of America. In February 1927, his brigadier general's rank was restored by a special act of Congress.

Nicholson died in Washington on December 20, 1931. His funeral took place at the Cathedral of St. Matthew the Apostle. Nicholson was buried at Arlington National Cemetery.

== Awards and decorations ==
In 1919, Georgetown University awarded Nicholson the honorary degree of Doctor of Laws (LL.D.).

In addition to the Distinguished Service Cross for his heroism at Montfaucon, Nicholson received the Distinguished Service Medal to recognize his superior service during World War I. In addition, he was a recipient of the Citation Star for wartime heroism. When the army created the Silver Star after the war, Citation Stars were converted to the new award. He also received the Legion of Honor (Officer) and Croix de Guerre from France.

=== Distinguished Service Cross Citation ===
The President of the United States of America, authorized by Act of Congress, July 9, 1918, takes pleasure in presenting the Distinguished Service Cross to Brigadier General William Jones Nicholson, United States Army, for extraordinary heroism in action while Commanding the 157th Infantry Brigade, 79th Division, A.E.F., near the Bois-de-Beuge, Montfaucon, France, 29 September 1918. General Nicholson established and maintained his brigade post of command on an exposed elevation near the Bois-de-Beuge, in order that he might effectively direct the attack of his brigade upon the Madeleine Farm and its surrounding woods. Realizing the importance of increased artillery support, he personally visited the division post of command behind Montfaucon to seek such support. In his absence the brigade post of command open to enemy observation was swept by a concentration of enemy machine-gun fire and artillery fire. In the face of this terrific fire General Nicholson, with great coolness and with complete disregard for his own safety, rode forward on horseback to his brigade post of command to issue orders for the renewed attack upon the Madeleine Farm, supervised the formation for attack, and by his brave and gallant example inspired the men of his command with renewed courage and determination, which enabled them to reach their objective and hold it against repeated enemy counterattacks.

Service: Army Rank: Brigadier General Division: 79th Division, American Expeditionary Forces General Orders: War Department, General Orders No. 15 (1923)

== Family ==
In 1883, Nicholson married Harriet Fenlon (1863–1940) of Wichita, Kansas. They were the parents of two children, William Corcoran Fenlon Nicholson (1883–1962) and Helen Lispenard Nicholson Crean (1893–1986).

== Sources ==
=== Books ===
- Adjutant General, Division of Cuba (1900). Roster of Troops Serving in the Division of Cuba. Havana, Cuba: US Army, Division of Cuba. p. 76 – via Google Books.
- Center of Military History (1988). Order of Battle of the United States Land Forces in the World War. Vol. 2. Washington, DC: U.S. Army. p. 318 – via Google Books.
- Davis, Henry Blaine Jr. (1998). Generals in Khaki. Raleigh, NC: Pentland Press. p. 282. ISBN 978-1-5719-7088-6 – via Google Books.
- Eisenhower, John (2001). Yanks: The Epic Story of the American Army in World War I. New York, NY: Simon & Schuster. pp. 219–221. ISBN 978-0-7432-1637-1 – via Google Books.
- History Committee, 79th Division Association (1922). History of the Seventy-Ninth Division, A. E. F. During the World War: 1917-1919. Lancaster, PA: Steinman & Steinman – via Internet Archive.
- Hong Kong Daily Press Office Staff (1912). The Directory & Chronicle. Hong Kong, China: Hong Kong Daily Press Office. p. 1473 – via Google Books.
- Moffat, Reuben Burnham (1904). The Barclays of New York. New York, NY: Robert Grier Cooke. pp. 167, 196 – via Internet Archive.
- Staff, State Historical Society of North Dakota (1949). North Dakota History. Vol. 16–17. Bismarck, ND: State Historical Society of North Dakota Foundation. p. 82 – via Google Books.
- U.S. Secretary of War (1898). Special Orders (1898). Vol. 2. Washington, DC: US Department of War. pp. 549, 1064 – via Internet Archive.
- U.S. Secretary of War (1907). Annual Report of the War Department. Vol. III. Washington, DC: US Government Printing Office. pp. 253–254 – via Google Books.

=== Internet ===
- U.S. Senate Committee on Military Affairs (January 16, 1883). "Marcus Reno's Courts-Martial: Senate Report No. 926". Little Bighorn.info. Diane Merkel.
- Military Times (2019). "Distinguished Service Cross Citation, William John (sic) Nicholson". Hall of Valor Project. Tysons, VA: Sightline Media Group.
- Russell, Sam (October 13, 2013). "Lieutenant William Jones Nicholson, Adjutant, 1st Battalion, 7th Cavalry". Army at Wounded Knee. Carlisle, PA: Samuel L. Russell.
- Military Times (2022). "Silver Star Citation, William John (sic) Nicholson". Hall of Valor Project. Tysons, VA: Sightline Media Group.

=== Newspapers ===
- "The Army and Navy: Movements of the Officers". National Republican. Washington, DC. May 20, 1882. p. 5 – via Newspapers.com.
- "Notes from Washington: The President sent the following nominations to the Senate to-day". The New York Times. New York, NY. February 12, 1884. p. 3 – via Newspapers.com.
- "Army Orders: William J. Nicholson". Evening Star. Washington, DC. April 9, 1884. p. 1 – via Newspapers.com.
- "Personal: Lieutenant John F. Morrison". Leavenworth Standard. Leavenworth, KS. May 4, 1887. p. 1 – via Newspapers.com.
- "The Second Day: The Seventh Cavalry". The Daily Commonwealth. Topeka, KS. October 3, 1888. p. 1 – via Newspapers.com.
- "Army Transfers". Evening Star. Washington, DC. August 22, 1890. p. 6 – via Newspapers.com.
- "Changes in the Army". Evening Star. Washington, DC. September 12, 1896. p. 6 – via Newspapers.com.
- "Changes Caused by Promotions". The Cincinnati Enquirer. Cincinnati, OH. September 13, 1896. p. 17 – via Newspapers.com.
- "Army Plums: The Tree was Given Another Vigorous Shake by the President Today". The Birmingham News. Birmingham, AL. July 20, 1898. p. 2 – via Newspapers.com.
- "Army Orders: Capt. William J. Nicholson". The Baltimore Sun. Baltimore, MD. July 22, 1898. p. 6 – via Newspapers.com.
- "Still More: New Staff Officers for Three Army Corps". The Courier-Journal. Louisville, KY. October 13, 1898. p. 3 – via Newspapers.com.
- "Army Orders: Captain Wm. J. Nicholson". Evening Star. Washington, DC. March 4, 1899. p. 3 – via Newspapers.com.
- Nicholson, William J. (September 8, 1899). "Notice to Cattlemen". Graham Guardian. Safford, AZ. p. 1 – via Newspapers.com.
- "Army Orders: Capt. W. J. Nicholson, 12th Cavalry". Evening Star. Washington, DC. April 23, 1901. p. 1 – via Newspapers.com.
- "Promotions in the Army: W. J. Nicholson". Evening Star. Washington, DC. July 18, 1903. p. 2 – via Newspapers.com.
- "City Briefs: Fenlon Nicholson". Leavenworth Times. Leavenworth, KS. March 29, 1904. p. 6 – via Newspapers.com.
- "To Forces of Land and Sea: Orders Issued to Members of Both Branches of the Service". The Baltimore Sun. Baltimore, MD. May 19, 1904. p. 2 – via Newspapers.com.
- "Inspecting National Guard". The Daily Republican. Monongahela, PA. February 15, 1905. p. 1 – via Newspapers.com.
- "Practice March to Nebraska: 1st Squadron, 7th Cavalry Will leave Oct. 1". Junction City Sentinel. Junction City, KS. September 27, 1907. p. 1 – via Newspapers.com.
- "Will Promote Riley Officers". The Daily Union. Junction City, KS. February 3, 1911. p. 1 – via Newspapers.com.
- "Promotions in the Cavalry". Evening Star. Washington, DC. September 8, 1912. p. 11 – via Newspapers.com.
- "Army Orders: Col. William J. Nicholson". Evening Star. Washington, DC. November 18, 1913. p. 11 – via Newspapers.com.
- "Second Cavalry Won Prizes at Madison Square Garden Horse Show". Burlington Free Press. Burlington, VT. December 22, 1914. p. 8 – via Newspapers.com.
- "Army Orders: Col. William J. Nicholson, 2d Cavalry". Evening Star. Washington, DC. February 11, 1915. p. 14 – via Newspapers.com.
- "Business Men Join U.S. Camp". Chicago Tribune. Chicago, IL. August 22, 1915. p. 12 – via Newspapers.com.
- "Army Orders: Col. William J. Nicholson, 5th Cavalry". Evening Star. Washington, DC. July 5, 1916. p. 20 – via Newspapers.com.
- "Inspection of Scar Reveals Robber". The Montgomery Times. Montgomery, AL. December 8, 1916. p. 6 – via Newspapers.com.
- "Cols. Nicholson and Allen Conspicuous". El Paso Herald. El Paso, TX. February 9, 1917. p. 4 – via Newspapers.com.
- "Six Army Training Schools to be Established in Army Here". El Paso Herald. El Paso, TX. April 14, 1917. p. 2 – via Newspapers.com.
- "Nicholson Gets Command". The Rock Island Argus. Rock Island, IL. April 28, 1917. p. 16 – via Newspapers.com.
- "Brigadier Generals Assigned". Evening Star. Washington, DC. January 5, 1919. p. 16 – via Newspapers.com.
- "D.S.C. for Gen. Nicholson". The Baltimore Sun. Baltimore, MD. April 5, 1919. p. 16 – via Newspapers.com.
- "Brig.-Gen. Nicholson Will Retire Today". The Baltimore Sun. Baltimore, MD. January 16, 1920. p. 1 – via Newspapers.com.
- "Gen. Nicholson Chosen". New York Herald. New York, NY. September 17, 1920. p. 18 – via Newspapers.com.
- "Brig. Gen. William J. Nicholson, Noted U.S. Military Figure, Catholic, Succumbs at 75". The Catholic Advance. Wichita, KS. N.W.C.W. News Service. January 2, 1932. p. 15 – via Newspapers.com.
- Kelly, Jerome (September 13, 1962). "Men of 313th to Gather 45 Years Later". The Evening Sun. Baltimore, MD. p. D1 – via Newspapers.com.

=== Magazines ===
- Cain, James M. (June 1929). "The Taking of Montfaucon". The American Mercury. New York, NY: Alfred A. Knopf – via Log Cabin Memorial – Veterans 314th Infantry Regiment A.E.F.
