= Joseph B. Murdock =

American politician

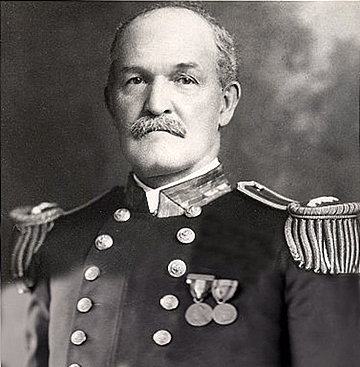
- Born: 13 February 1851; Hartford, Connecticut, US
- Died: 20 March 1931 (aged 80); Manchester, New Hampshire, US
- Burial place: Mount Auburn Cemetery, Cambridge and Watertown, Massachusetts
- Military career
- Allegiance: United States
- Branch: United States Navy
- Service years: 1870–1913; 1918–1919
- Rank: Rear Admiral
- Commands: USS Alliance; USS Denver (CL-16); USS Rhode Island (BB-17); New York Navy Yard; Third Naval District; Battleship Division Three, U.S. Atlantic Fleet; Second Division, U.S. Atlantic Fleet; United States Asiatic Fleet
- Conflicts: Spanish–American War; Battle of Santiago de Cuba; World War I
- Other work: New Hampshire House of Representatives 1921–1927

Rear Admiral Joseph Ballard Murdock (13 February 1851 – 20 March 1931), sometimes spelled Murdoch, was an officer in the United States Navy. He fought in the Spanish–American War, was Commander-in-Chief of the United States Asiatic Fleet, and came out of retirement to serve during World War I. In retirement, he was a member of the New Hampshire House of Representatives. He also was an author of books on naval and scientific subjects.

== Naval career ==
Murdock was born in Hartford, Connecticut, on 13 February 1851, the son of The Reverend John N. Murdock and the former Martha Ballard. After an education in public schools in Boston and Cambridge, Massachusetts, he was appointed to the United States Naval Academy in Annapolis, Maryland, from the 4th Congressional District of Massachusetts on 26 July 1866. He graduated on 7 June 1870.

Murdock's first tour was aboard the gunboat USS Nipsic in the North Atlantic Squadron from July 1870 to November 1872; he was promoted to ensign on 13 July 1871 while aboard Nipsic. After leaving Nipsic, he stood for an examination and then was on leave until March 1873. He served aboard the screw sloop-of-war USS Monongahela in the South Atlantic Squadron from September 1873 to July 1874 and was promoted to master on 2 February 1874 while aboard Monongahela. He then was assigned to the screw sloop-of-war USS Lancaster from July 1874 to July 1875.

Murdock next had duty with the United States Coast Survey – which became the United States Coast and Geodetic Survey in 1878 during his tour – from October 1875 to June 1879. From August 1879 to September 1880 he was aboard the frigate USS Constitution in the Training Squadron, and he was promoted to lieutenant on 10 March 1880 while aboard Constitution.

After a tour as an instructor at the Naval Academy from October 1880 to September 1883, Murdock took a leave of absence until August 1884, followed by special duty in Philadelphia, Pennsylvania, until December 1885. He returned to sea that month, assigned to the gunboat and dispatch vessel USS Dolphin, remaining aboard her until December 1886, when he reported to the Naval Torpedo Station at Newport, Rhode Island, for a tour of duty that lasted until March 1888.

Murdock served aboard the screw steamer USS Pensacola from March to April 1888, then aboard the screw sloop-of-war USS Omaha in the Asiatic Squadron from April 1888 to March 1891. He had special duty in Europe from March to November 1891, then reported to the New York Navy Yard in Brooklyn, New York, on 2 November 1891 for electrical duty.

Leaving the navy yard, Murdock served aboard the protected cruiser USS Atlanta in the North Atlantic Squadron from April to December 1894, then aboard the protected cruiser USS Minneapolis in the North Atlantic Squadron and the European Squadron from December 1894 to March 1897. He was at the Naval War College in Newport, Rhode Island, from April 1897 to April 1898, when, upon the outbreak of the Spanish–American War, he became executive officer of the troop transport and auxiliary cruiser USS Panther, seeing action aboard her in the blockade of Cuba, the landing of United States Marines along the Cuban coast, and in the Battle of Santiago de Cuba before the war ended in August 1898.

Leaving Panther in October 1898, Murdock returned to the Naval War College that month, being promoted to lieutenant commander on 3 March 1899 and remaining at the college until October 1899. He was executive officer of the armored cruiser USS New York from October 1899 to November 1900, when he returned to the Naval War College. He was promoted to commander on 16 June 1901 during this tour at the war college.

Near the end of 1902, Murdock was selected to be the commanding officer of the gunboat USS Alliance in the Atlantic Training Squadron. On 17 May 1904, he became the first commanding officer of the new protected cruiser USS Denver upon her commissioning at Philadelphia, Pennsylvania, and commanded her in operations along the United States East Coast and in the Caribbean until October 1905.

Murdock was promoted to captain on 22 January 1906 and on 30 April 1906 became a member of the Naval Examining Board and of the Naval Retiring Board. He was commanding officer of the battleship USS Rhode Island during the round-the-world cruise of the Great White Fleet between December 1907 and February 1909. He returned to the New York Navy Yard to serve as both its commandant and as commander of the Third Naval District from 15 May 1909 to 21 March 1910. and was promoted to rear admiral on 20 November 1909. From 1910 to April 1911 he commanded the Second Division and Battleship Division Three of the United States Atlantic Fleet with the battleship USS Minnesota as his flagship.

Murdock became commander-in-chief of the United States Asiatic Fleet on 16 May 1911. In mid-1911, Rear Admiral Reginald F. Nicholson was chosen to succeed Murdock as commander-in-chief of the fleet as of November 1911, but Murdock had gained distinction in his handling of unrest in China related to the Xinhai Revolution of that year, and United States Secretary of State Philander C. Knox requested that Murdock be kept on as fleet commander-in-chief to allow continuity until the situation in China stabilized. Nicholson instead was dispatched to the Asiatic Fleet to command its Yangtze Patrol. In February 1912, with the Chinese crisis having abated, it was again proposed that Nicholson succeed Murdock, but Knox again asked that Murdock stay on as fleet commander-in-chief. On 20 July 1912, Nicholson finally received orders to take command of the Asiatic Fleet, and he relieved Murdock on 24 July 1912.

Returning to the United States, Murdock finished his naval career with a stint as a member of the General Board of the United States Navy and of the Joint Army and Navy Board. He retired from the Navy after 43 years of service on 13 February 1913 at the mandatory retirement age of 62. After the United States entered World War I, however, Murdock was recalled to active Navy service to be president of the general court martial at the Portsmouth Navy Yard in Kittery, Maine. He served from 2 May 1918 until 1 May 1919, when he resumed his retirement.

== Political career ==
Murdock had a summer home in Hill, New Hampshire, of which he had been a legal resident since 1884, and in retirement he moved permanently to Hill and lived there for the rest of his life. He became involved in New Hampshire politics as a member of the Republican Party, and he was a member of the New Hampshire House of Representatives from 1921 to 1927. While in office, he was Chairman of the House Committee on National Affairs and a member of the Appropriations Committee and of the Forestry Committee (later Commission).

== Personal life ==
Murdock was a member of the American Philosophical Society, Franklin Institute, Union Club of Boston, Army and Navy Club of Washington, D.C., Sons of the Revolution, and Society of Colonial Wars. He was an author who wrote papers and monographs on naval and scientific subjects such as electricity.

Murdock married the former Anne Dillingham (25 December 1852 – 3 November 1930) on 26 June 1879. She died in their home in Hill a few months before Murdock's death.

== Death ==
Murdock died in a hospital in Manchester, New Hampshire, on 20 March 1931. He is buried at Mount Auburn Cemetery in Cambridge and Watertown, Massachusetts.

Military offices
Preceded by John Hubbard	Commander-in-Chief, United States Asiatic Fleet; 16 May 1911 – 24 July 1912	Succeeded by Reginald F. Nicholson
