= USS Rowan (TB-8) =

Torpedo boat of the United States Navy

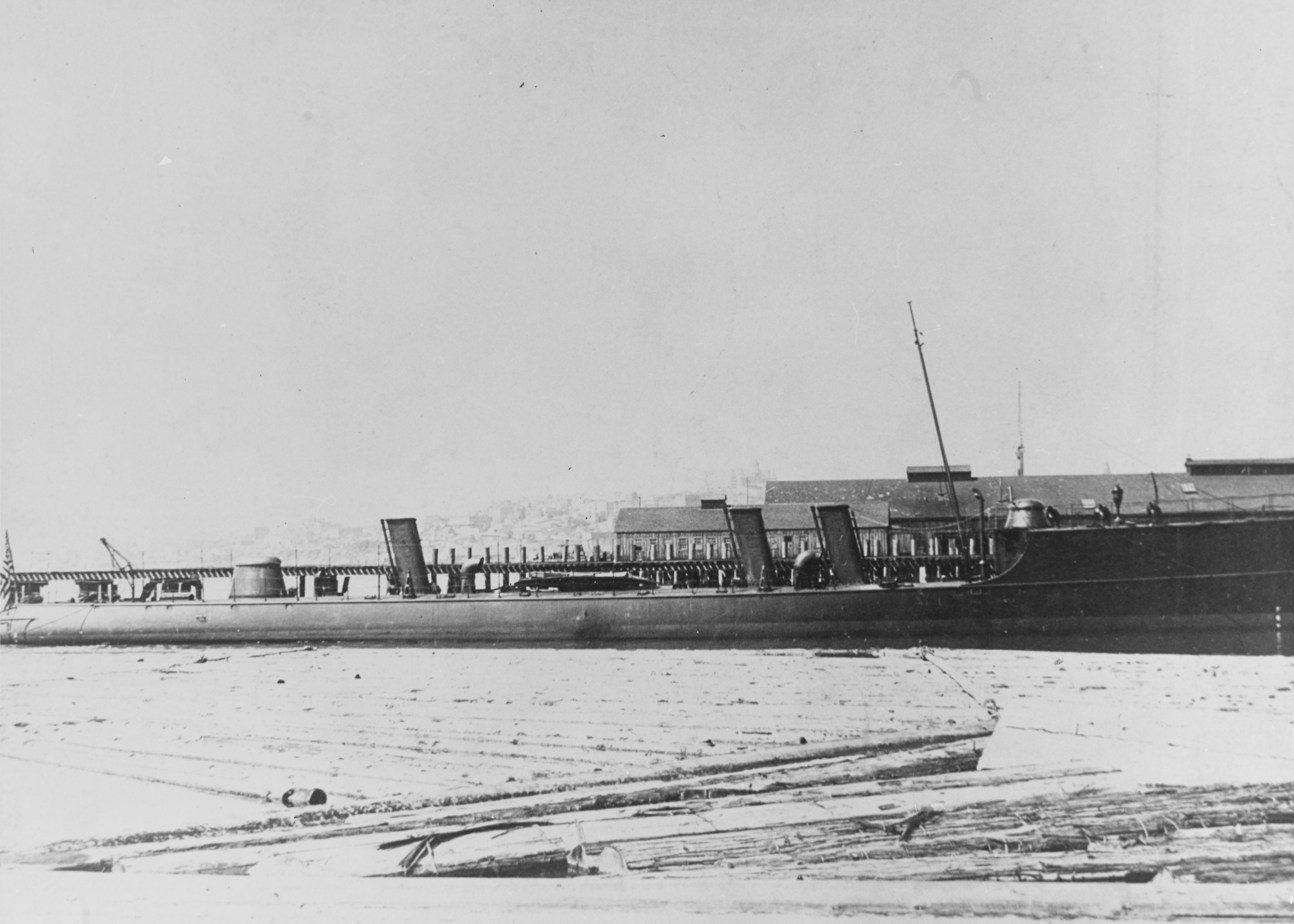
- USS Rowan (TB-8) in port, circa the late 1890s or early 1900s.

History

United States
- Name: Rowan
- Namesake: Vice Admiral Stephen Rowan
- Ordered: 2 March 1895 (authorised)
- Builder: Moran Brothers Co. Seattle, WA
- Laid down: 22 June 1896
- Launched: 8 April 1898
- Sponsored by: Mrs. Edward Moale, Jr.
- Commissioned: 1 April 1899
- Decommissioned: 1 May 1899
- Recommissioned: 23 April 1908
- Decommissioned: 28 October 1912
- Stricken: 29 October 1912
- Identification: TB-8
- Fate: Sold for scrap 3 June 1918

General characteristics
- Class & type: Rowan-class torpedo boat
- Displacement: 210 long tons (213 t)
- Length: 170 ft (52 m)
- Beam: 17 ft (5.2 m)
- Draft: 5 ft 11 in (1.80 m) (mean)
- Installed power: 3 × Mosher boilers; 3,200 ihp (2,386 kW)
- Propulsion: vertical quadruple expansion engines; 2 × screw propellers
- Speed: 26 knots (48 km/h; 30 mph); 27.07 kn (31.15 mph; 50.13 km/h) (Speed on Trial)
- Complement: 24 officers and enlisted
- Armament: 4 × 1-pounder (37 mm (1.46 in)) guns; 3 × 18 inch (450 mm) torpedo tubes (3x1)

The first USS Rowan (Torpedo Boat No. 8/TB-8) was a torpedo boat in the United States Navy during the Spanish–American War. She was named for Vice Admiral Stephen Rowan.

Rowan was laid down on 22 June 1896 by Moran Brothers Company, Seattle, Washington; launched 8 April 1898; sponsored by Mrs. Edward Moale, Jr.; and commissioned on 1 April 1899, Lieutenant Reginald F. Nicholson in command. After trials in Puget Sound, Rowan was decommissioned on 1 May 1899.

Rowan was recommissioned on 23 April 1908 and on 21 June she departed Bremerton, Washington, for Mare Island Navy Yard in Vallejo, California. For the next year she cruised off the United States West Coast, from the Canada–US border to Magdalena Bay, Mexico, as a unit of the 3rd Torpedo Flotilla. Then assigned to the Reserve Torpedo Group at Mare Island, she resumed operations with the torpedo flotilla in December 1909 and continued that duty until 1912.

Rowan was decommissioned at Mare Island on 28 October 1912. Her name was struck from the Navy list the following day and her hulk was sold for scrap on 3 June 1918.
