= 335th Infantry Regiment =

U.S. Army infantry regiment

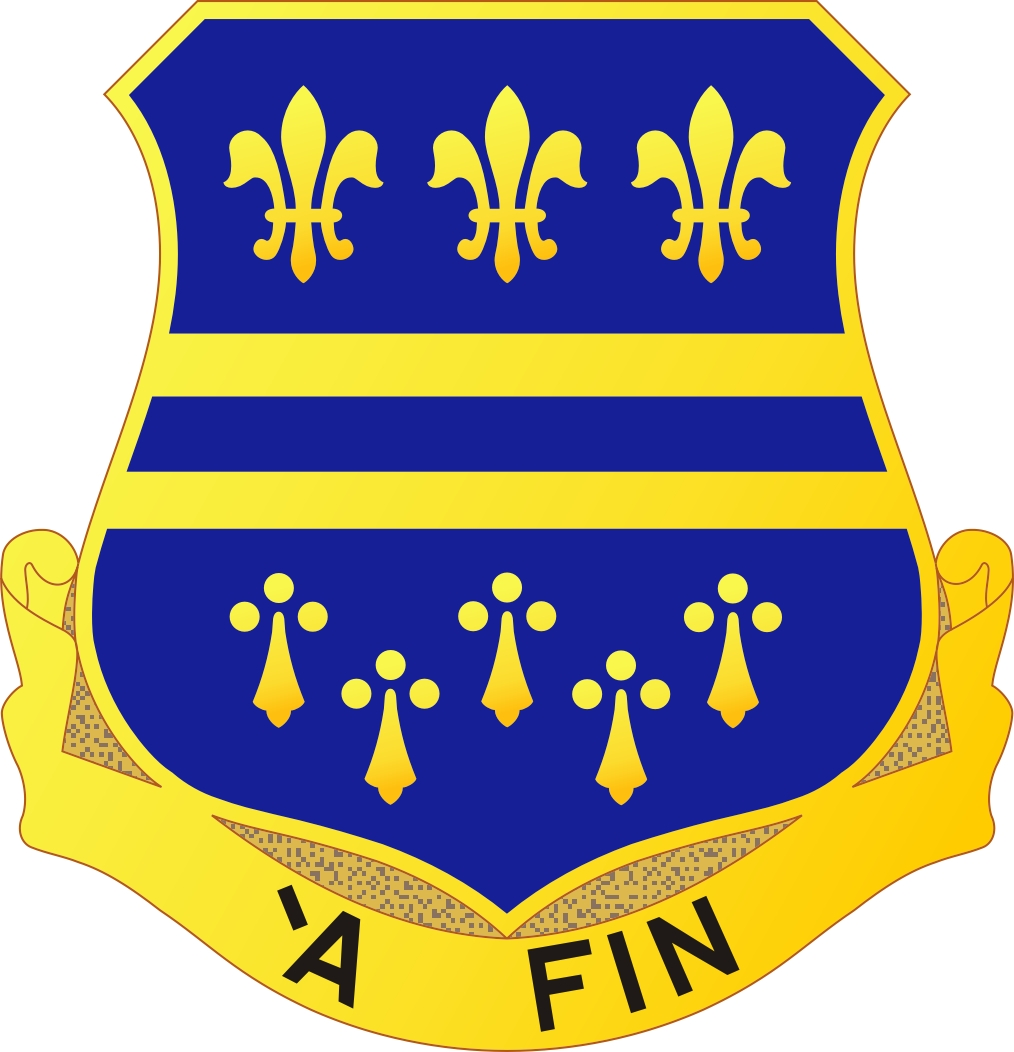
- Active: 1917-Present
- Country: United States
- Branch: United States Army
- Role: Training
- Size: Regiment
- Garrison/HQ: 1-335 IN BN, Camp Atterbury, Indiana/ 3-335 TSBN Reserve, Fort Sheridan, Illinois
- Nickname: 1-335 "Warriors"/ 3-335 "Blackhawks"
- Motto: "A-Fin" or "To the end"
- Decorations: 3d Battalion entitled to: Army Superior Unit Award for 2003-2004 French Croix de Guerre with Palm, World War II for BELGIUM
- Battle honours: World War I: Streamer without inscription World War II: Rhineland; Ardennes-Alsace; Central Europe

Insignia
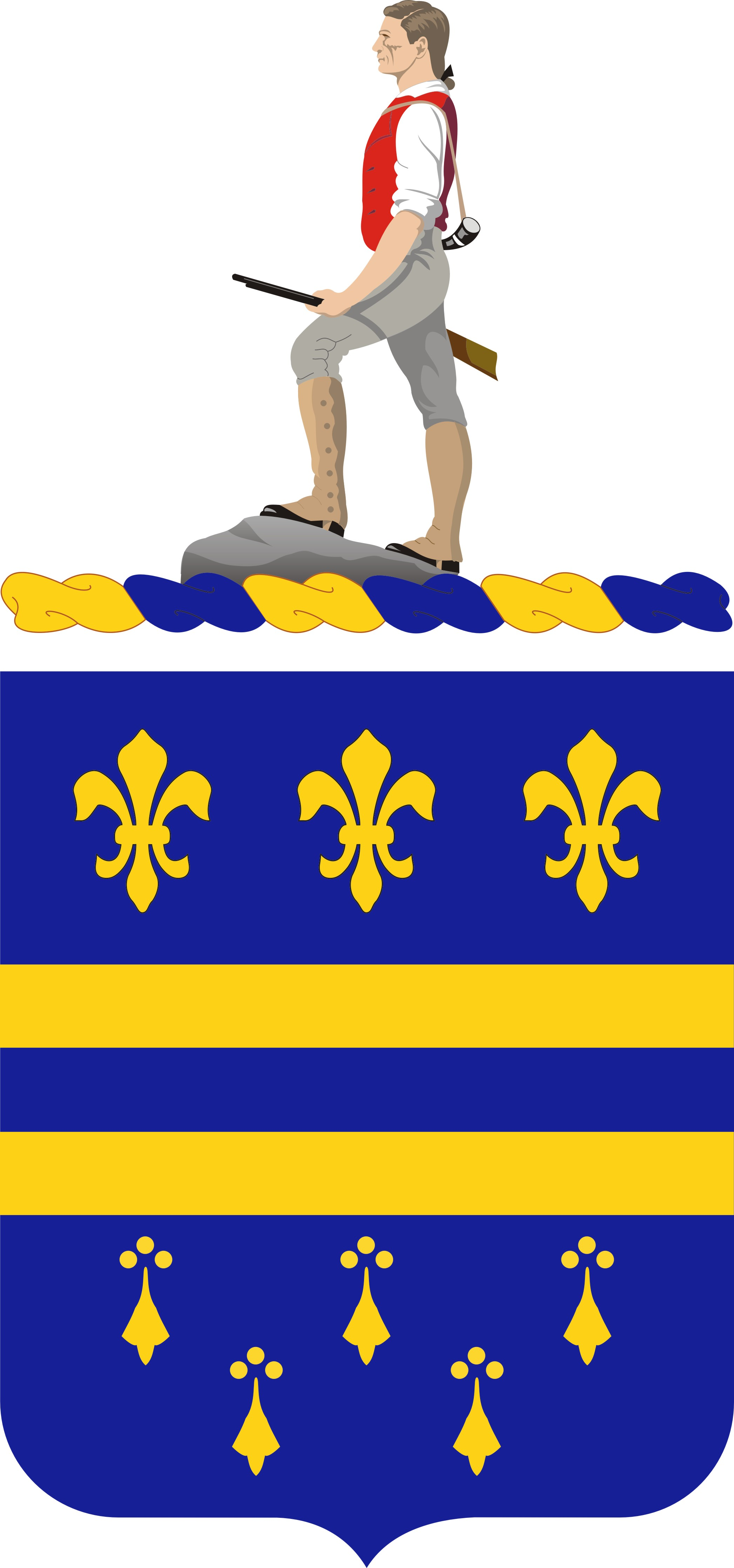
- Coat of arms

The 335th Infantry Regiment is an infantry regiment in the United States Army. There are two active battalions in the 335th Infantry Regiment. The 1st Battalion, 335th Infantry Regiment is an infantry regiment of the active-duty United States Army. The battalion is composed of observer, controller, trainer teams (OC/T) teams that support various Army National Guard units across the Midwest. The battalion is currently stationed at Camp Atterbury, Indiana under 157th Infantry Brigade. The brigade's higher headquarters are First Army Division East and First Army. The 3rd Battalion, 335th Infantry Regiment is a Training Support Battalion located in Fort Sheridan, Illinois and is a part of the US Army Reserves and the 85th Infantry Division (United States).

== World War One ==
The history of the 335 Infantry Regiment begins at the beginning of the 20th century where it was constituted on 5 August 1917 in the National Army as the 335th Infantry and assigned to the 84th Division. The unit was further organized 26 August 1917 at Camp Zachary Taylor, Kentucky in preparation for American entry in to World War One. The unit was Demobilized 18 February 1919 at Camp Zachary Taylor, Kentucky.

== First Interwar Period and World War Two ==
The 335 Regiment was reconstituted 24 June 1921 in the Organized Reserves as the 335th Infantry and assigned to the 84th Division (later redesignated as the 84th Airborne Division). The unit was organized in November 1921 with Headquarters at Muncie, Indiana. The 335 regiment was ordered into active military service on 15 October 1942 and reorganized at Camp Howze, Texas. The unit participated in the Rhineland, Ardennes-Alsace, and Central Europe again under the 84th Infantry division. During the war the Unit like most division suffered from poor organizational structure and had obsolete anti tank weapons. However, the German Army suffered from deficencies of their own and ultimately German inability to execute the Ardennes offensive due to a lack of capability induced by attrition.

== Post World War Two and Cold War ==
The 335th regiment was inactivated 23 January 1946 at Camp Kilmer, New Jersey, and redesignated 19 December 1946 as the 335th Parachute Infantry. The unit was reactivated 13 August 1947 in the Organized Reserves with Headquarters at Chicago, Illinois, where the 3rd Battalion is still located. The Organized Reserve were redesignated 25 March 1948 as the Organized Reserve Corps, and 9 July 1952 as the Army Reserve. during this period the unit was transferred from the 84th Airborne Division to the 85th Infantry Division. The unit was reorganized and redesignated 1 June 1959 as the 335th Regiment, an element of the 85th Training Division. The 85th Training Division was reorganized 31 January 1968 to consist of the 1st, 2d, and 3d Battalions. These reforms began in the Eisenhower administration and continued into the Kennedy and Johnson administrations, culminating in the Flexible Response reforms implemented by Secretary of Defense Robert S. McNamara.

== Desert Storm to Present ==
The 1st Battalion ordered into active military service 25 January 1991 at Granite City, Illinois; released from active military service 21 March 1991 and reverted to reserve status. The unit participated in Desert Storm with only 100 hours of hostilities. The unit was then Reorganized 1–15 October 1993 to consist of the 2d and 3d Battalions, elements of the 85th Division (Exercise). Reorganized 17 October 1999 to consist of the 1st, 2d, and 3d Battalions, elements of the 85th Division (Training Support); 1st and 2d Battalions concurrently allotted to the Regular Army.

== Campaign Participations ==
- World War I: Streamer without inscription
- World War II: Rhineland; Ardennes-Alsace; Central Europe

=== Decorations ===
- 1st Battalion entitled to: Army Superior Unit Award for 2004-2006; Army Superior Unit Award for 2008-2011.
- 3d Battalion entitled to: Army Superior Unit Award for 2003-2004, Army Superior Unit Award for 2008-2011; French Croix de Guerre with Palm, World War II for BELGIUM

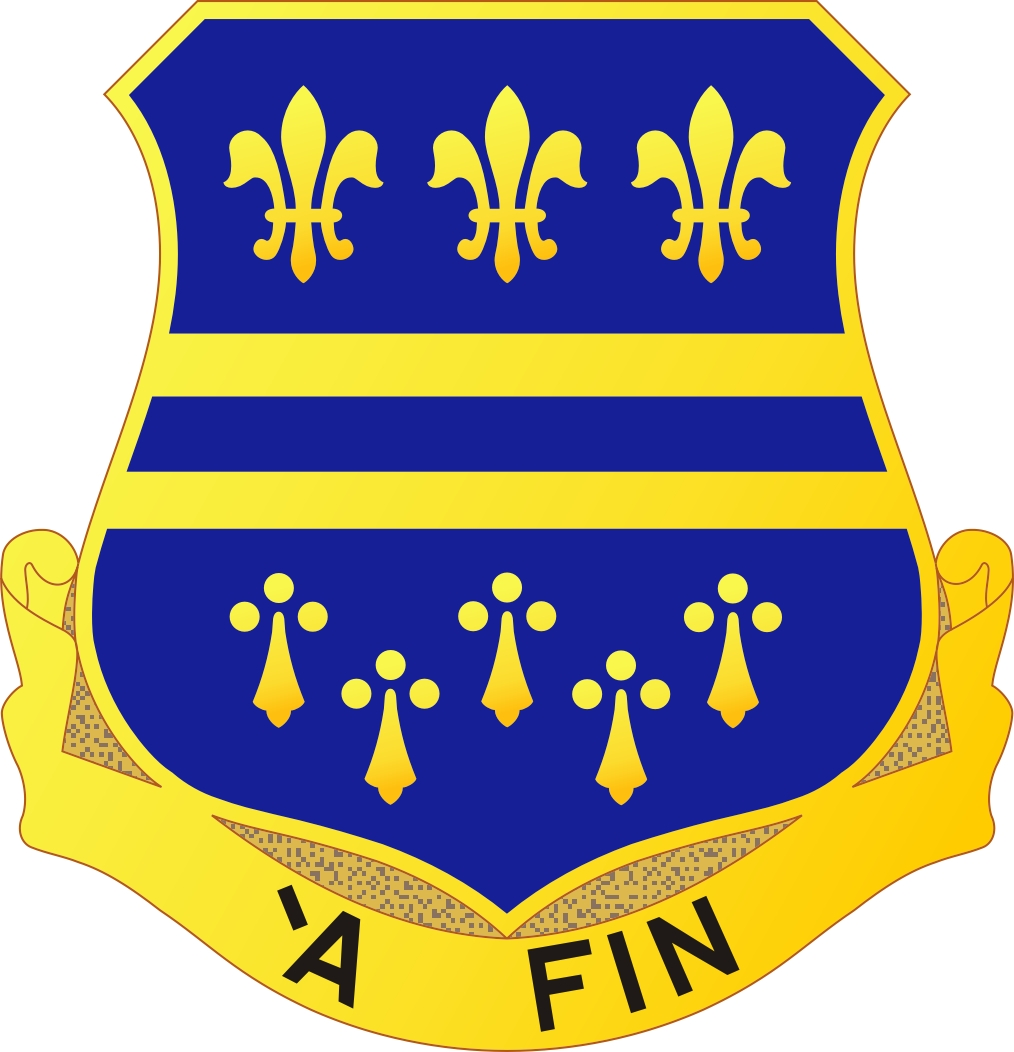
335th Infantry Regimental Crest

== Regimental Crest and Coat of Arms ==
- The unit crest consists of a shield on a field of azure for the state of Indiana and the Infantry branch with gold instrumentation. The 3 fleurs-de-lis and the three bars two of which are gold with the middle being blue and the five ermine spots symbolize the numbering of the unit. The unit motto is A Fin which translates to "To the End" in English the unit uses Vulgar Latin to express its motto as traditional Latin would be "Ad Finis"
- The coat of arms (pictured at the top) is blue for the state of Indiana and the infantry combined with gold instrumentation. The numbered symbolism present in the crest is also present in the coat of arms.
