= 157th Infantry Brigade (United States) =

- Shoulder sleeve insignia
- Active: 5 August 1917–7 June 1919 (National Army); 24 June 1921–11 December 1945 (various designations); 28 January 1947–20 April 1959 (Army Reserve); 5 November 1962–1 September 1995; 24 October 1997–16 October 1999 (Regular Army); 1 December 2006–present
- Country: United States
- Branch: United States Army
- Type: Infantry
- Role: Training
- Size: Brigade
- Part of: 85th Support Command
- Garrison/HQ: Camp Atterbury
- Engagements: World War I; Meuse-Argonne; Lorraine 1918; World War II; Normandy; Northern France; Rhineland; Ardennes-Alsace; Central Europe
- Decorations: French Croix de Guerre with Palm; Army Superior Unit Award

Commanders
- Current commander: Colonel Frank A. Hooker
- Notable commanders: Brigadier General Harry J. Mier; Brigadier General Edwin D. Miller; Colonel Richard B. Smith; Brigadier General Dean W. Meyerson; Brigadier General Talmadge J. Jacobs; Brigadier General Joseph M. Cannon; Brigadier General John L. Kotcho; Brigadier General William J. Collins Jr. Brigadier General Eddi Z. Zyko; Brigadier General William J. Nicholson

Insignia
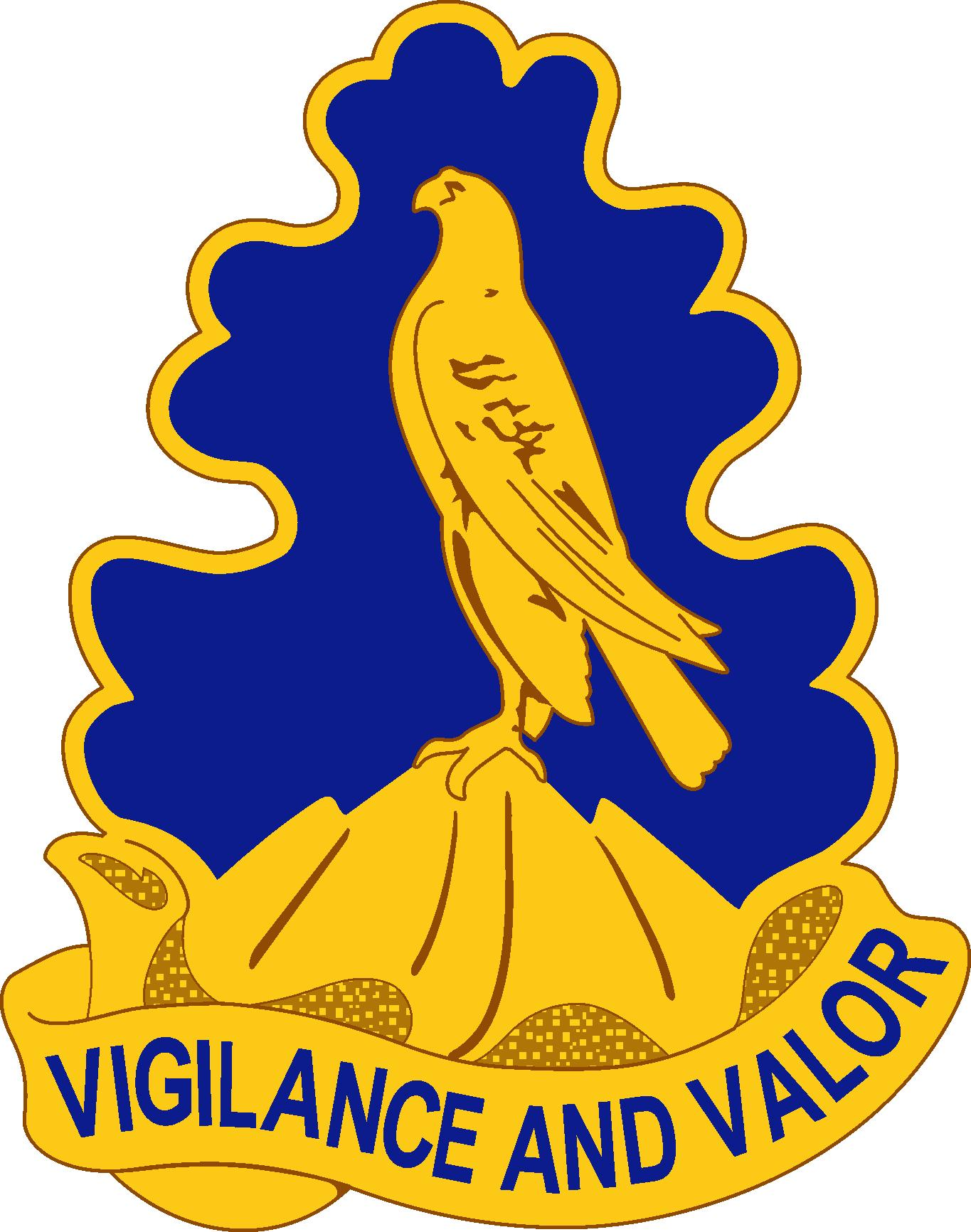
- Distinctive unit insignia

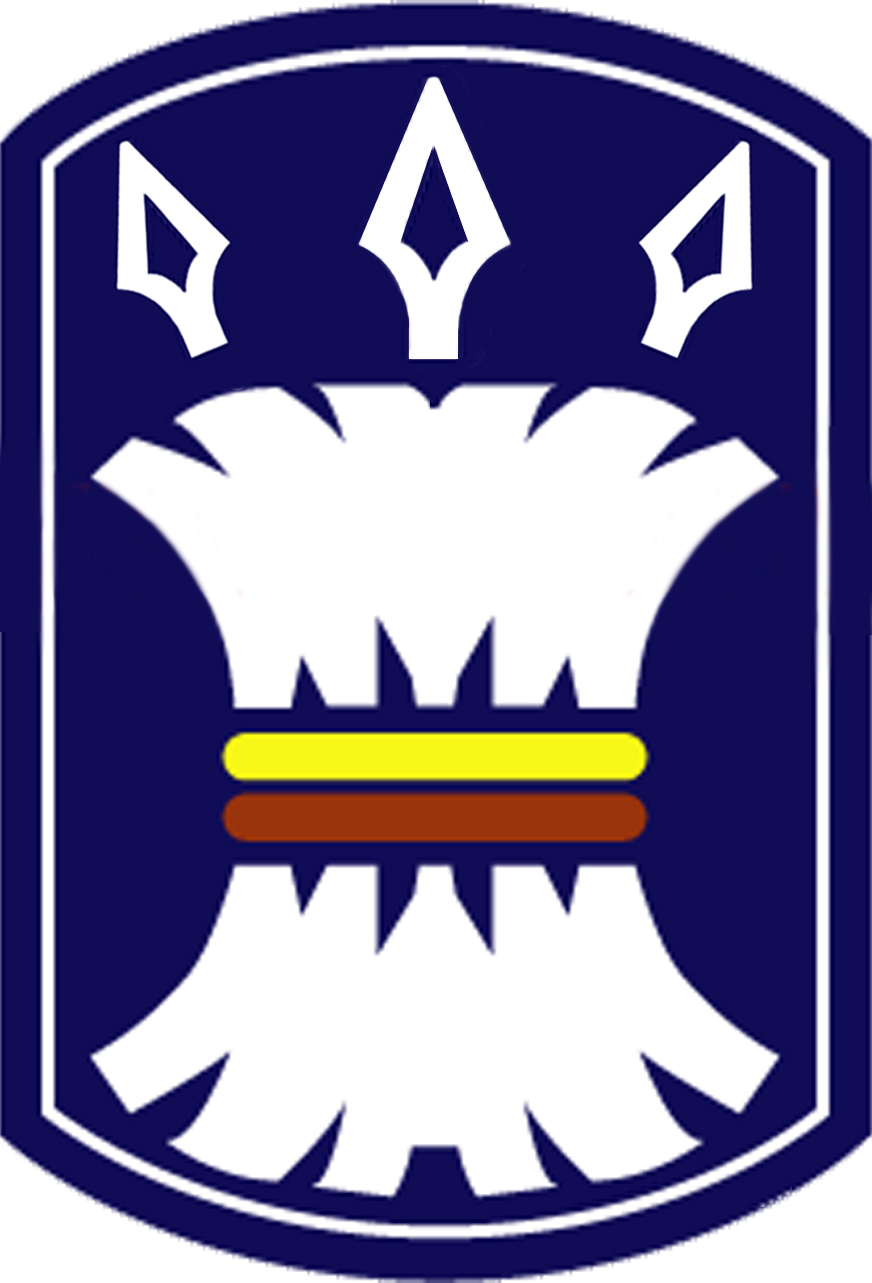
- Designated shoulder sleeve insignia; worn before assignment to First Army

The 157th Infantry Brigade is an active/reserve component (AC/RC) unit based at Camp Atterbury, Indiana. The unit is responsible for training selected United States Army Reserve and National Guard units. The unit was activated using the assets of the 5th Brigade, 87th Division. The brigade is a subordinate unit of First Army Division East.

== Activation ==
The 79th Division "Liberty" Division, also known as the "Lorraine" Division, was a National Army division established 5 August 1917 by the War Department to be formed at Camp Meade, Maryland. The division was commanded by Maj. Gen. Joseph E. Kuhn. Draftees were from Pennsylvania and Maryland. Movement overseas commenced on 6 July 1918 and was completed by 3 August 1918. The 157th Infantry Brigade was commanded by Brig. Gen. William Jones Nicholson.

The Brigade consisted of:

- Headquarters and Headquarters Company
- 313th Infantry Regiment
- 314th Infantry Regiment
- 311th Machine Gun Battalion

Shrouded in secrecy, the brigade left from Hoboken, New Jersey in July 1918 on the SS Leviathan, a speedy ex-German liner that arrived at Brest, France the morning of 15 July 1918. They trained for two months at Champ Little behind the French lines. On 26 September 1918 they "went over the top" in the Meuse-Argonne offensive. In a period of heartbreaking losses, the men struggled through nine kilometers of barbed wire and pot-marked earth. They destroyed German defenses that were said to be impregnable. That night they were on the outskirts of Montfaucon, headquarters of the enemy command. The 313th fought until the end, 11 November 1918. The 313th registered what was believed to be the last casualty of any belligerents of World War I, when PVT Henry Gunther was killed at 10:59am while charging a German machine gun nest, only seconds before the cease fire began. Gen. John J. Pershing commended the men of the 79th Division, and especially the 313th Infantry Regiment whose forces penetrated deeper into enemy territory than any other outfit.

== Organization 1963-1995 ==
The 157th Infantry Brigade (Mechanized) was reactivated on 3 January 1963 in Upper Darby, Pennsylvania using assets from the inactivating 79th Infantry Division. It moved to Horsham on 31 January 1968, where it remained until its inactivation on 1 September 1995 during the post-Cold War drawdown. In 1966 this Brigade consisted of 3 Infantry Battalions: the 1–313th IN co-located Indiantown Gap Military Reservation (IGMR), since redesignated Fort Indiantown Gap (FIG), Annville, PA; and at Lock Haven, PA; the 1–314th IN (Mechanized) co-located at Bristol and Warrington, PA; the 1–315th IN located at 5200 Wissahickon Ave, Philadelphia, PA. It had 2 Armor Battalions at that time: namely, the 4–77th AR (location uncertain) and the 6–68th AR co-located at Bethlehem, PA and IGMR, PA. After the Arab-Israeli War of 1967, the 4–77th was disbanded, its armored vehicles sent to Israel to replace Israeli losses, and its personnel merged into the 6–68th AR. That same year, the Brigade's 1–314th IN (Mechanized) lost its armored vehicles- primarily M578s, M113s, M59s and M577s all of which were also sent to Israel to replace their war losses. It was not until the summer of 1971 that the 1–314th IN was re-designated a Mechanized unit. By the summer of 1973 the 1–313th IN was disbanded with its personnel and company units redesignated as part of the 1–314th IN.

The unit consisted of:

- Headquarters and Headquarters Company – Horsham, Pennsylvania
- Troop C, 9th Cavalry – Wilkes Barre, Pennsylvania
- 1st Battalion, 313th Infantry (Mechanized)- Fort Indiantown Gap, Pennsylvania (disbanded 1973)
- 1st Battalion, 314th Infantry (Mechanized) – Lock Haven, Pennsylvania
- 1st Battalion, 315th Infantry (Mechanized) – Germantown, Pennsylvania
- 6th Battalion, 68th Armor – Bethlehem, Pennsylvania
- 4th Battalion, 77th Armor – Reading, Pennsylvania (disbanded 1967)
- 3rd Battalion, 42nd Field Artillery – Bristol, Pennsylvania (replaced by the 4th Battalion, 8th Field Artillery Regiment in 1976)
- 157th Support Battalion – Edgemont, Pennsylvania
- 420th Engineer Company – Pittsburgh, Pennsylvania

== Organization 2026 ==
In 2006, as part of the Army's Transformation Plan, the 5th Brigade, 87th Division was reflagged as the 157th Infantry Brigade. The brigade is a Combined Arms Training Brigade (CATB) assigned to the 85th Support Command. Like all formations of the 85th Support Command, the brigade is not a combat formation, but instead trains Army Reserve and Army National Guard units preparing for deployment. As of January 2026, the brigade consists of a Headquarters and Headquarters Company, six active duty battalions, and five reserve battalions.

- 157th Infantry Brigade, at Camp Atterbury (IN)
  - Headquarters and Headquarters Company, at Camp Atterbury (IN)
  - 2nd Battalion, 289th Regiment (Infantry), at Camp Atterbury (IN)
  - 1st Battalion, 290th Regiment (Brigade Support Battalion), at Camp Atterbury (IN)
  - 2nd Battalion, 307th Regiment (Field Artillery), at Camp Atterbury (IN)
  - 1st Battalion, 335th Regiment (Infantry), at Camp Atterbury (IN)
  - 3rd Battalion, 335th Regiment (Training Support), at Fort Sheridan (IL)
  - 2nd Battalion, 337th Regiment (Training Support), in Waterford (MI)
  - 2nd Battalion, 338th Regiment (Training Support), at Camp Atterbury (IN)
  - 3rd Battalion, 338th Regiment (Training Support), in Blacklick (OH)
  - 1st Battalion, 345th Regiment (Brigade Engineer Battalion), at Camp Atterbury (IN)
  - 1st Battalion, 362nd Regiment (Air Defense Artillery), at Camp Atterbury (IN)
  - 3rd Battalion, 411th Regiment (Logistical Support), at Camp Atterbury (IN)

The brigade's four training support battalions and logistical support battalion are Army Reserve formations.

== Lineage ==
Constituted 5 August 1917 in the National Army as Headquarters, 158th Infantry Brigade, and assigned to the 79th Division

Organized 25 August 1917 at Camp Meade, Maryland

Demobilized 7 June 1919 at Camp Dix, New Jersey

Reconstituted 24 June 1921 in the Organized Reserves as Headquarters and Headquarters Company, 157th Infantry Brigade, and assigned to the 79th Division

Organized in November 1921 at Wilkes-Barre, Pennsylvania

Redesignated 23 March 1925 as Headquarters and Headquarters Company, 157th Brigade

Redesignated 24 August 1936 as Headquarters and Headquarters Company, 157th Infantry Brigade

Converted and redesignated 12 February 1942 as the 79th Reconnaissance Troop (less 3d Platoon), 79th Division (Headquarters and Headquarters Company, 158th Infantry Brigade, concurrently converted and redesignated as the 3d Platoon, 79th Reconnaissance Troop, 79th Division)

Troop ordered into active military service 15 June 1942 and reorganized at Camp Pickett, Virginia, as the 79th Cavalry Reconnaissance Troop, an element of the 79th Division (later redesignated as the 79th Infantry Division)

Reorganized and redesignated 2 August 1943 as the 79th Reconnaissance Troop, Mechanized

Inactivated 11 December 1945 at Camp Kilmer, New Jersey

Activated 28 January 1947 at Philadelphia, Pennsylvania, as the 79th Mechanized Cavalry Reconnaissance Troop

(Organized Reserves redesignated 25 March 1948 as the Organized Reserve Corps; redesignated 9 July 1952 as the Army Reserve)

Reorganized and redesignated 15 July 1949 as the 79th Reconnaissance Company

Inactivated 20 April 1959 at Philadelphia, Pennsylvania

Converted and redesignated (less 3d Platoon) 5 November 1962 as Headquarters and Headquarters Company, 157th Infantry Brigade, and relieved from assignment to the 79th Infantry Division (3d Platoon, 79th Reconnaissance Company, concurrently redesignated as Headquarters and Headquarters Company, 158th Infantry Brigade – hereafter separate lineage)

Brigade activated 7 January 1963 at Upper Darby, Pennsylvania

Location changed 31 January 1968 to Horsham, Pennsylvania

Inactivated 1 September 1995 at Horsham, Pennsylvania

Withdrawn 24 October 1997 from the Army Reserve and allotted to the Regular Army; Headquarters concurrently activated at Fort Jackson, South Carolina

Inactivated 16 October 1999 at Fort Jackson, South Carolina

Activated 1 December 2006 at Fort Jackson, South Carolina

== Campaign Credit ==
Conflict	Streamer	Year(s)
World War I	Meuse-Argonne	1918
World War I	Lorraine 1918	1918
World War II	Normandy	1944
World War II	Northern France	1944
World War II	Rhineland	1945
World War II	Ardennes-Alsace	1944–1945
World War II	Central Europe	1945

== Decorations ==
Ribbon	Award	Year	Notes
	Army Meritorious Unit Commendation	Afghanistan Retrograde 2021-2022	Permanent Orders 032-0001 announcing award of the Army Meritorious Unit Commendation
	Army Superior Unit Award	2008–2011	Permanent Orders 332-07 announcing award of the Army Superior Unit award
	French Croix de Guerre, with Palm		PARROY FOREST
	French Croix de Guerre, with Palm		NORMANDY TO PARIS
	French Croix de guerre, Fourragere		World War II
