= Pontecorvo (disambiguation) =

Pontecorvo (or Ponte Corvo) is a town in Italy.

Pontecorvo or Ponte Corvo may also refer to :

== Bridges ==
- Ponte Corvo (bridge) ("raven bridge"), an Ancient Roman bridge in Padua, northern Italy

== Places ==
- Duchy of Pontecorvo, one of the Papal States and a papal governorship
- Principality of Pontecorvo (1806–1815), created by Napoleon I Bonaparte

== People with the surname ==
- Bruno Pontecorvo (1913–1993), Italian physicist
- Eugene Pontecorvo, fictional character on the HBO series, The Sopranos
- Gillo Pontecorvo (1919–2006), Italian filmmaker
- Guido Pontecorvo (1907–1999), Italian geneticist

== See also ==
- Ponte (disambiguation)
- Ponti (disambiguation)
- Pont (disambiguation)
