= Ponty =

Ponty may be:

== Places ==
- Pontardawe, a town in Neath Port Talbot, Wales
- Pontypridd, a town in Rhondda Cynon Taf, Wales
- Pontypool, a town in Torfaen, Wales
- Pontefract in West Yorkshire, England is also referred to as Ponty
- Ponty Vineyards (also known as Vignobles Ponty), Bordeaux wine estate in Canon Fronsac

== People ==
- Maurice Merleau-Ponty (1908 – 1961), a French philosopher
- Jean-Luc Ponty (b. 1942), a French musician

== Other uses ==
- ST Ponty, a tugboat
- Pontypridd RFC, a Welsh Premiership rugby team from Rhondda Cynon Taf, Wales

== See also ==
- Pont (disambiguation)
- Ponte (disambiguation)
- Ponti (disambiguation)
- Ponzi
