= Negroponte =

Negroponte may refer to:

== Places ==
- Chalkis, capital of Euboea, Greece
- Euboea, a Greek island of which Chalkis is the capital
- Triarchy of Negroponte, crusader state established on the island after the Fourth Crusade

== Persons ==
- Fra Antonio da Negroponte (16th century), Italian painter of the early-Renaissance period
- Eleni Ourani-Negreponte (1896–1971), Greek writer
- Kostas Negreponte (1897–1973), Greek footballer
- Dimitrios Negreponte (1915–1996), Greek skier
- John Negroponte (born 1939), American diplomat and Deputy Secretary of State
- Nicholas Negroponte (born 1943), Greek American architect and founder of the MIT Media Lab
- Diana Villiers Negroponte (born 1947), American trade lawyer

== Other uses ==
- Bailo of Negroponte, the representative of the Republic of Venice at Chalcis, Greece
- Negroponte family, Genoese-Byzantine noble family

== See also ==
- Black Bridge (disambiguation)
- Ponte (disambiguation)
- Siege of Negroponte (disambiguation)
- White Bridge (disambiguation)
- Whitebridge (disambiguation)
