= Black Bridge (disambiguation) =

Black Bridge is a 2006 Canadian drama/comedy film.

Black Bridge, Blackbridge, or BlackBridge may also refer to:

== Bridges ==
- Black Bridge (The Nilgiris), a bridge in The Nilgiris District, Tamil Nadu, India
- Nuneham Railway Bridge or the Black Bridge, a railway bridge in England near Abingdon, Oxfordshire
- Telescopic Bridge, Bridgwater or the Black Bridge, a retractable railway bridge in Bridgwater, Somerset, England
- The Black Bridge, a bridge across the River Shannon, at Plassey, County Limerick, Ireland
- Black Suspension Bridge, a bridge in Grand Canyon National Park

== Organizations ==
- Black Bridge (Russia), anti-Putin secret paramilitary group

== See also ==
- Black Hawk Bridge, a bridge spanning the Mississippi River
- Black River Bridge (disambiguation)
- Černý Most (English: "Black Bridge"), a housing estate in Prague
- Negroponte (disambiguation)
- White Bridge (disambiguation)
- Whitebridge (disambiguation)
