= White Bridge =

White Bridge or Whites Bridge may refer to:

== Bridges ==
- Athlone Railway Bridge, Co. Westmeath, Ireland
- White Bridge (Vilnius), a pedestrian bridge in Vilnius, Lithuania
- White Bridge (Mysia), a Roman bridge across the river Granicus in Mysia, now Turkey
- White Bridge (Iran), a suspension bridge located in Ahwaz, Iran
- White Bridge (Stonehaven), a pedestrian bridge in Stonehaven, Scotland
- White Bridge (Vranje), a pedestrian bridge in Vranje, Serbia
- White Bridge (in Russian: Белый мост), former (1737–1778) name for the Red Bridge (Saint Petersburg)
- White Bridge (in German: Weiße Brücke), a road bridge in Munich, Germany
- White Bridge, Poland, Ohio, a bridge listed on the NRHP in Mahoning County, Ohio
- Whites Bridge, near Smyrna, Michigan
- Zubizuri (White bridge in Basque language), a pedestrian bridge in Bilbao, Spain

== See also ==
- Black Bridge (disambiguation)
- Negroponte (disambiguation)
- Whitebridge (disambiguation)
