= Joseph Dupont =

Joseph Dupont may refer to:

- Joseph Dupont (bishop) (1850–1930), French missionary bishop to Zambia
- Joseph Dupont (violinist) (1838–1899), Belgian violinist and conductor

== See also ==
- Dupont (disambiguation)
