= Ponto =

Ponto may refer to:

- Ponto District, one of districts of the province Huari in Peru
- Ponto Lake, lake located east of Backus, Minnesota

== People ==
- Erich Ponto (1884–1957), German actor
- Jürgen Ponto (1923–1977), German banker

== See also ==
- Ponte (disambiguation)
- Ponti (disambiguation)
