= Spencer S. Wood =

United States Navy admiral (1861–1940)

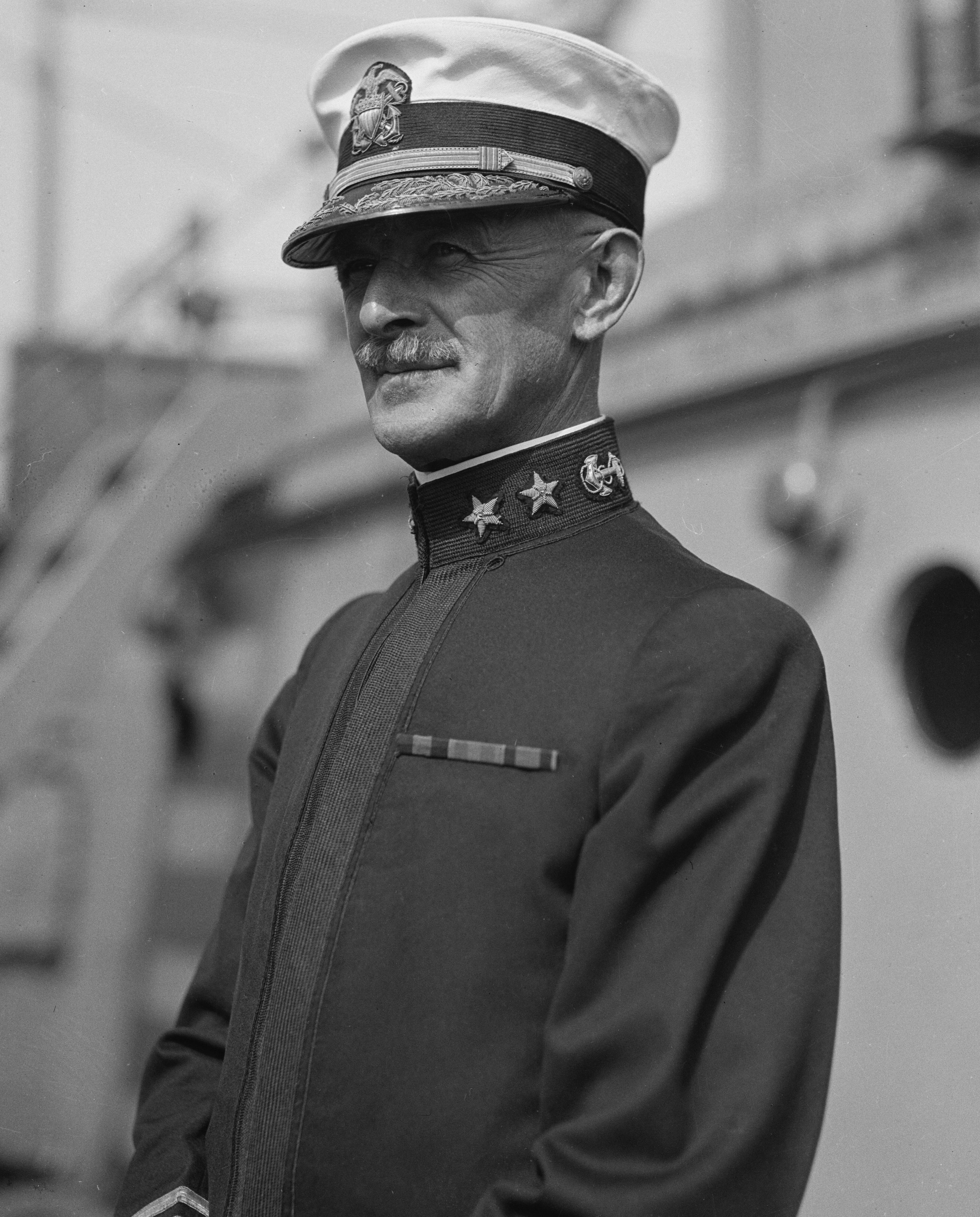
- Wood in 1920
- Born: 7 August 1861; Brooklyn, New York, US
- Died: 30 July 1940 (aged 78); New York City, US
- Burial place: Arlington National Cemetery
- Relatives: Joseph C. Harsch (son-in-law)
- Military career
- Allegiance: United States
- Branch: United States Navy
- Service years: 1882–1921
- Rank: Rear Admiral
- Commands: USS Du Pont (TB-7); USS New York (ACR-2); USS Nebraska (BB-14); USS Oklahoma (BB-37); First Naval District; Cruiser Division One, U.S. Pacific Fleet
- Conflicts: Spanish–American War; World War I
- Awards: Navy Cross

Rear Admiral Spencer Shepard Wood (7 August 1861 – 30 July 1940) was a United States Navy officer. His career included service in the Spanish–American War and World War I, command of battleships and cruisers, and duty as an aide to a number of senior naval leaders.

== Early life ==
Wood was born in Brooklyn, New York, on 7 August 1861. His family moved to New York City—politically separate from Brooklyn at the time—while he was an infant, and he lived there until the age of 11. He then moved with his grandparents to Flushing, New York, where he attended the Flushing Institute.

In June 1877, Wood applied to take the competitive examination for admission to the United States Military Academy at West Point, New York, but was turned away for being too young. In 1878, he was appointed to the United States Naval Academy at Annapolis, Maryland, from the 1st Congressional District of New York by Congressman James W. Covert. He passed the entrance examination and entered the Naval Academy as a cadet midshipman on 28 June 1878.

== Naval career ==
=== 1882–1898 ===
Wood graduated from the Naval Academy second in his class in 1882. His first assignment was aboard the sloop-of-war USS Vandalia at Hampton Roads, Virginia. After about a year, he transferred in 1883 to duty as an aide on the staff of Rear Admiral George H. Cooper, commander of the Home Squadron, aboard the screw frigate USS Tennessee, during which duty he accompanied Cooper on a visit to Caracas, Venezuela, to attend the unveiling of a statue of George Washington there.

In May 1884, Wood passed the final examination at the Naval Academy for his final graduation, remaining second his class, and he was promoted to ensign on 1 July 1884. He then was assigned to the Naval Experimental Battery at Annapolis for work on new Navy guns and gunpowder.

Wood reported aboard the sloop-of-war USS Iroquois at Panama—at the time a part of the United States of Colombia—in May 1885 and cruised the west coast of South America aboard her until the autumn of 1887, when Iroquois steamed to San Francisco, California, for decommissioning. After she was decommissioned in early 1888, Wood was reassigned to duty aboard the United States Coast and Geodetic Survey survey ship USC&GS Carlile P. Patterson for surveying work along the southeastern coast of the Territory of Alaska, including the Portland Canal, until October 1888. In November 1888 he was among a group of four officers ordered to Mexico and Central America to make astronomical observations to determine the longitude of Coatzacoalcos and Salina Cruz in Mexico, La Libertad in El Salvador, and San Juan del Sur in Nicaragua; the group then traveled to Washington, D.C., to complete its calculations.

In September 1889, Wood requested a return to sea duty and was assigned to the Asiatic Squadron, where he served consecutively aboard the screw sloop-of-war USS Omaha, the gunboat USS Monocacy, and the tug USS Palos as executive officer and navigator before spending his final year in the squadron as flag lieutenant for the squadron commander, Rear Admiral George E. Belknap, whom he accompanied back to the United States in early 1892. He then awaited orders for two months at his home in Flushing until receiving an assignment in the office of the Assistant Secretary of the Navy. In March 1893 he became naval aide to United States Secretary of the Navy Hilary Abner Herbert, and during his tour, which lasted over a year, oversaw many of the details related to guests invited to the 1893 Naval Review in New York City, accompanied Herbert to New York aboard the gunboat and dispatch vessel USS Dolphin, and escorted President Grover Cleveland from Jersey City, New Jersey, to his hotel and the following day from his hotel to Dolphin for the review.

At his own request, Wood was relieved of his duties in the spring of 1894 so that he could become flag secretary to Rear Admiral John G. Walker, who was taking command of the Pacific Squadron at the time with orders from President Cleveland to observe and report on developments in the Hawaiian Islands, governed by a provisional government in the aftermath of the 1893 overthrow of the Kingdom of Hawaii. Promoted to lieutenant, junior grade, on 11 April 1894 and serving aboard the protected cruiser USS Philadelphia at Honolulu while in the Pacific Squadron, Wood in his duties supporting Walker observed Hawaii's Constitutional Convention and was present at the 4 July 1894 proclamation of that constitution as law, establishing the Republic of Hawaii. He returned to the United States with Walker in September 1894.

Wood next became flag secretary to Rear Admiral Richard W. Meade, the commander of the North Atlantic Squadron, aboard the armored cruiser USS New York. When Meade retired in May 1895, Wood reported for duty aboard the receiving ship USS Vermont at the New York Navy Yard in Brooklyn, New York. In September 1895 he took the torpedo instruction course at the Naval Torpedo Station in Newport, Rhode Island.

In October 1895, Wood was ordered to the Herreshoff Manufacturing Company in Bristol, Rhode Island, as assistant inspector for the construction of the torpedo boats USS Porter and USS Du Pont there, and was present throughout their construction and sea trials. When his superior, Commander George A. Converse, was detached from duty as inspector, Wood took over as inspector for the construction of Du Pont, and, after being promoted to lieutenant on 16 September 1897, he became her first commanding officer when she was commissioned on 23 September 1897. Du Pont joined the other torpedo boats of the Torpedo Flotilla in a voyage southward along the United States East Coast, visiting most of the ports between Hampton Roads, Virginia, and Key West, Florida, before arriving at Key West on 31 December 1897.

=== Spanish–American War ===
From Key West, Wood commanded Du Pont in patrol duties and operations as a dispatch vessel. On 22 April 1898, she accompanied the fleet to Cuba for operations during the Spanish–American War, which had broken out that month. Under his command, Du Pont was part of the blockade of Matanzas, Cuba, until 7 May 1898, exchanging fire with Spanish forts there on 6 May 1898; carried dispatches on 16 May 1898 from Key West to Rear Admiral William T. Sampson, commander of the North Atlantic Squadron, in the Old Bahama Channel; carried dispatches from Key West on 20 May 1898 to Commodore Winfield Schley, commander of the Flying Squadron, off Cienfuegos, Cuba; accompanied ships carrying United States Army forces from the United States to southern Cuba and thereafter patrolled off Santiago de Cuba and carried out dispatch duty along the south coast of Cuba; and carried Sampson's dispatch announcing the American victory in the Battle of Santiago de Cuba on 3 July 1898 to Siboney, Cuba, for transmission to the United States. She departed Cuban waters for New York City on 3 August 1898, shortly before the end of the war.

=== 1898–1917 ===
After turning Du Pont over to the Naval Torpedo Station at Newport in the autumn of 1898, Wood reported for duty aboard the battleship USS Massachusetts. He remained aboard her until 12 October 1899, then transferred to the armored cruiser USS Brooklyn and journeyed aboard her to Manila in the Philippine Islands, where she arrived in December 1899. On 11 February 1900, he became flag secretary to the commander of the Asiatic Squadron, Rear Admiral John C. Watson. In April 1900, he transferred to the protected cruiser USS Baltimore and traveled in her back to the United States, where he was relieved of his flag secretary duties on 30 April 1900. On 26 September 1900, he transferred from Baltimore to duty as assistant to the lighthouse inspector in the Third District.

On 20 January 1902, Wood reported for duty aboard the protected cruiser USS Chicago, and by the beginning of 1904 he had transferred to the protected cruiser USS Columbia. Leaving that duty in October 1904, he became aide to Admiral of the Navy George Dewey on 20 October 1904, and served in that capacity until 1908. He took command of the armored cruiser USS New York on 1 April 1908 and, after leaving her in March 1910, became a member and the secretary of the General Board of the United States Navy on 5 March 1910. In 1912, he was the plaintiff in a case before the United States Supreme Court, Spencer Wood v. United States, over pay he believed was owed to him while serving as Dewey's aide; the court ruled against him on 1 April 1912.

Wood took command of the battleship USS Nebraska on 20 February 1912. After leaving her in January 1914, he attended the Naval War College, from which he graduated in late 1914. He again became a member of the General Board of the United States Navy on 28 December 1914, serving in that capacity until 1917.

=== World War I ===
After the United States entered World War I in April 1917, Wood became the second commanding officer of the battleship USS Oklahoma in the United States Atlantic Fleet on 6 June 1917. On 24 December 1917, Secretary of the Navy Josephus Daniels announced the promotion of twelve captains to a temporary rank of rear admiral for World War I service, and Wood was among them. He remained aboard Oklahoma until 1 February 1918, involved primarily in the training of her crew and a refit of the ship, and received the Navy Cross for "exceptionally meritorious service" while in command of her. After leaving Oklahoma, he was commandant of the First Naval District through the end of the war in November 1918 and into 1919.

=== Later career ===
During his tour in the First Naval District, the Second Naval District was abolished on 15 March 1919 and his First Naval District split the defunct district's responsibilities with the Third Naval District. At the time, the Newport sex scandal involving homosexual contact between U.S. Navy personnel of the former Second Naval District and civilians in Newport, Rhode Island, had arisen, and he ordered a thorough investigation of the situation.

In April 1919, Wood became the commander of the United States Pacific Fleet's Cruiser Division 1 with the protected cruiser USS Chicago as his flagship, and in 1920 and 1921 he commanded the division during its deployment to waters off Honduras to protect American interests there.

Wood retired from the Navy on 19 December 1921.

== Personal life ==
Wood married the former Margaretta Fryer in June 1895. They were survived by two daughters, Margaretta Wood (Potter) and Anne Elizabeth Wood, who married the newspaper, radio, and television journalist Joseph C. Harsch in 1932. Margaretta Wood was a longtime confidante of the American naval spy Commander Hugo W. Koehler, step father of United States Senator Claiborne Pell (D-RI). At the time of her death in 1985, she had been working on research for a biography of Koehler at Pell's behest. The research was completed by the historian P.J. Capelotti and published in 1991 as Our Man in the Crimea: Commander Hugo Koehler and the Russian Civil War

In 1921, Wood bought the John Stoddert Haw House in the Georgetown section of Washington, D.C. After his death, it passed to Anne Elizabeth Wood Harsch in 1941.

He was buried with his wife at Arlington National Cemetery in Arlington, Virginia.

== Commemoration ==
In 1918, U.S. Navy Chief Yeoman (F) Daisy May Pratt Erd, stationed at First Naval District headquarters under Wood's command, published a song, the "Rear Admiral Wood One-Step," she had composed in Wood's honor. She contributed all profits from sales of the sheet music to the Navy Relief Society.

Wood's papers are held at the U.S. Navy's Naval History and Heritage Command.

== Gallery ==
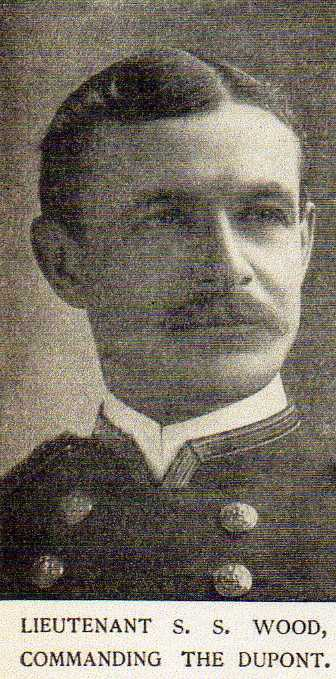
Wood as a lieutenant while in command of the torpedo boat USS Du Pont, 1897–1898

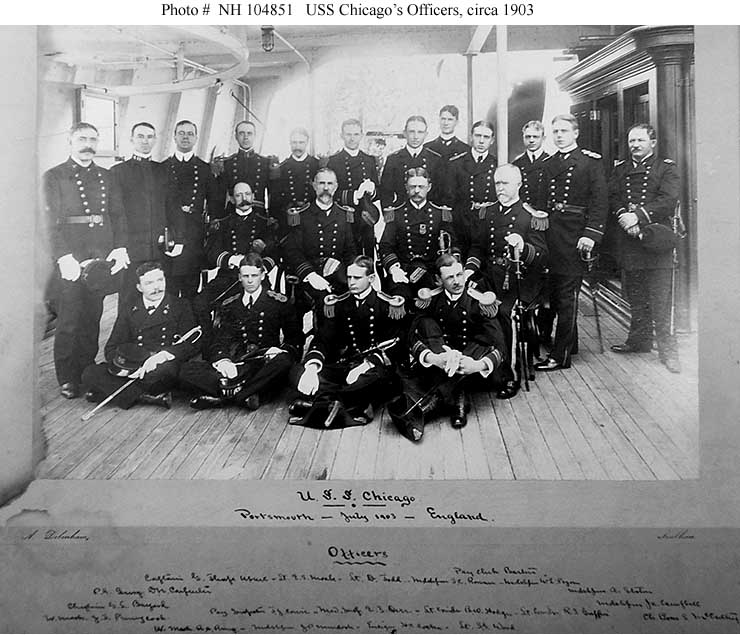
Wood as a lieutenant, seated on the deck in the front row on the right in this photograph of the officers of the protected cruiser USS Chicago, c. 1903

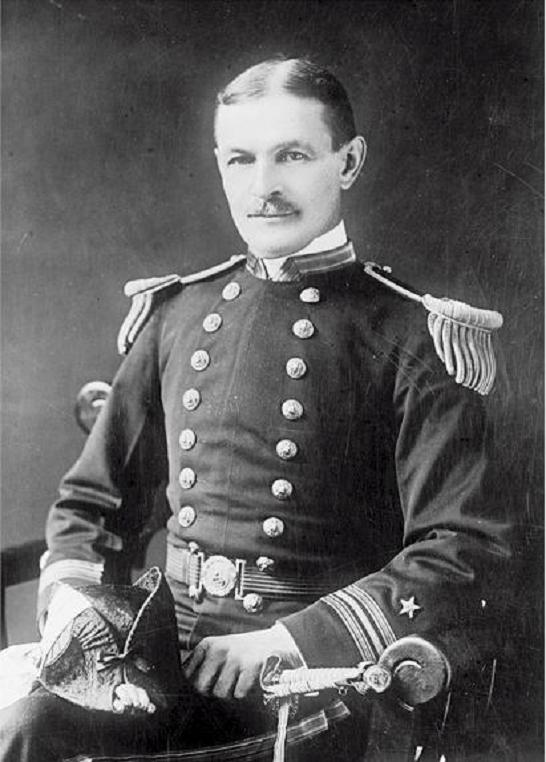
Wood as a lieutenant commander in the early 20th century

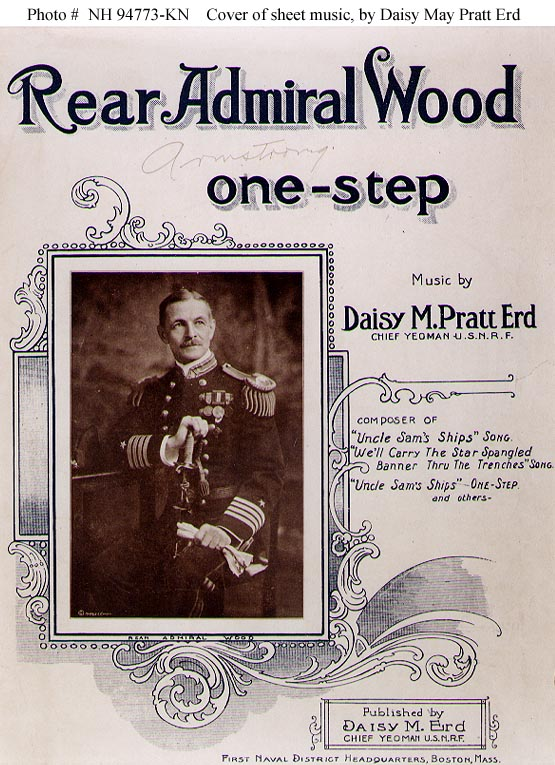
Cover sheet for the "Rear Admiral Wood One-Step", c. 1918

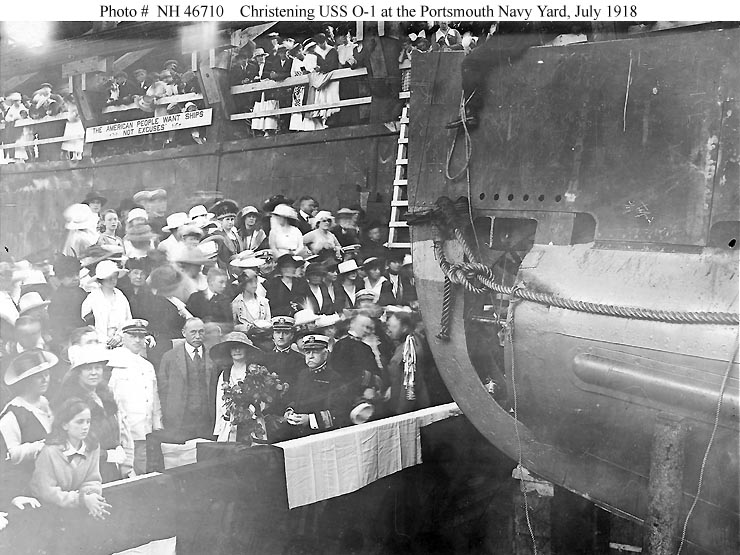
Wood (in white uniform at lower left) attends the christening of the submarine USS O-1, 9 July 1918.

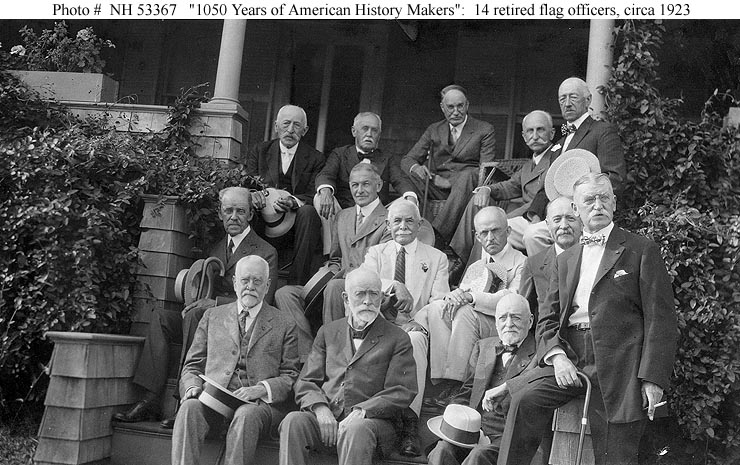
Wood is second from left in the middle row of this photograph of retired flag officers, c. 1923.

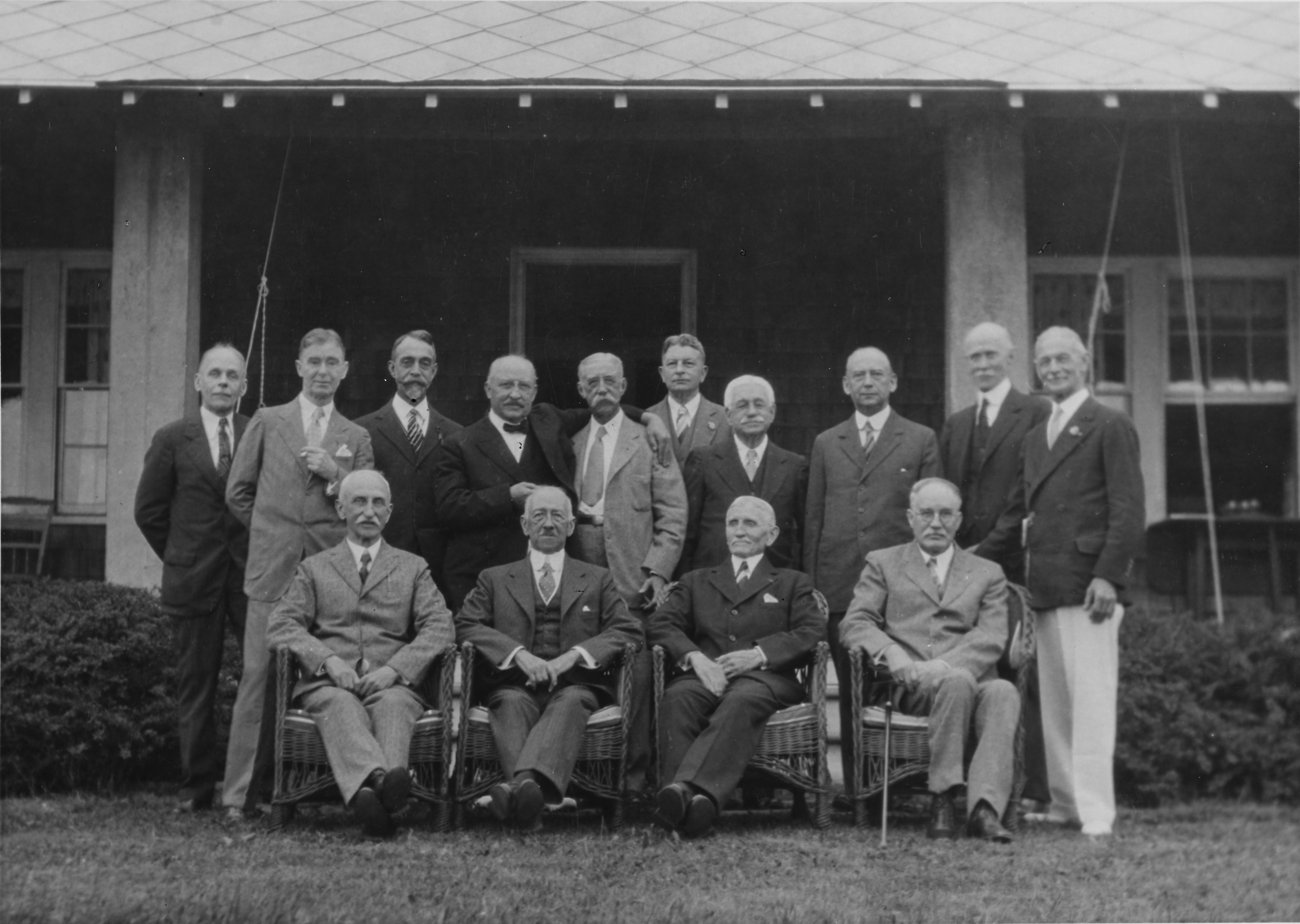
Wood is standing farthest on the right in this 7 August 1928 photograph of retired U.S. Navy rear admirals and other retirees at Wood's home in Jamestown, Rhode Island.
