= John Stoddert Haw House =

Historic house in Washington, D.C., United States

- U.S. National Register of Historic Places
- U.S. National Historic Landmark District – Contributing property
- D.C. Inventory of Historic Sites
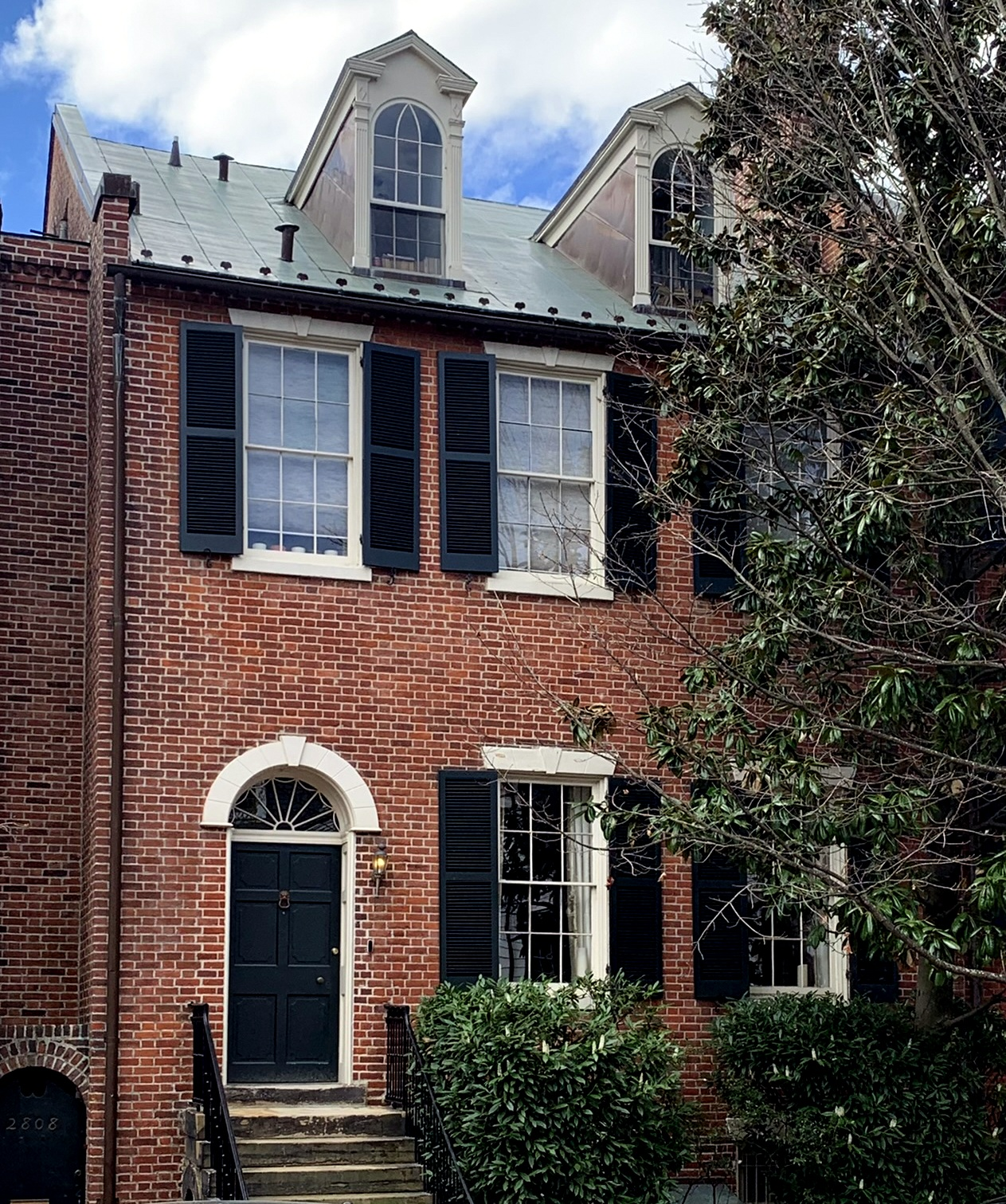
- John Stoddert Haw House in 2022

- Location within Washington, D.C.
- Location: 2806 N Street, N.W. Washington, D.C.
- Coordinates: 38°54′24″N 77°3′29″W
- Built: 1816
- Architectural style: Federal
- Part of: Georgetown Historic District (ID67000025)
- NRHP reference No.: 73002089

Significant dates
- Added to NRHP: June 19, 1973
- Designated DCIHS: November 8, 1964

John Stoddert Haw House is a historic building, located at 2808 N Street, Northwest, Washington, D.C., in the Georgetown neighborhood.

== History ==
The building was constructed in 1816, and is an example of Federal architecture.

In 1815, it was bought by Benjamin Stoddert's nephew, John Stoddert Haw. On July 19, 1817, it was assessed for US$5,000.

In 1921, United States Navy Rear Admiral Spencer S. Wood bought the house. After his death in 1940, it passed in 1941 to his daughter Anne Elizabeth Wood Harsch, who was married to Joseph C. Harsch.

In 1962, Chester Bowles bought the house. In 1967, George C. McGhee bought it.

The house is listed on the National Register of Historic Places, and is a contributing property to the Georgetown Historic District. Its 2009 property value was $2,935,970.

== See also ==
- Isaac Owens House
