= USS Du Pont =

Three ships of the United States Navy have borne the name USS Du Pont, in honor of Rear Admiral Samuel Francis Du Pont.

- USS Du Pont (TB-7), a Porter-class torpedo boat, launched in 1897, renamed Coast Torpedo Boat No. 3 in 1918, and sold in 1920.
- USS Du Pont (DD-152), a Wickes-class destroyer, launched in 1918 and sold in 1947.
- USS Du Pont (DD-941), a Forrest Sherman-class destroyer, launched in 1956 and sold in 1993.
