= Dupont Plaza Hotel =

Dupont Plaza Hotel may refer to:

- Dupont Plaza Hotel (Miami), a hotel in Miami, Florida, 1957–2004
- Dupont Plaza Hotel arson, 1986
- Hotel Dupont Plaza in San Juan, Puerto Rico, former name of San Juan Marriott Resort & Stellaris Casino

== See also ==
- Dupont (disambiguation)
