= Ponti =

Ponti may refer to:

== Places ==
- Ponti, Greece, a village in the Drama region of Greece
- Ponti, Piedmont, a province of Alessandria, Piedmont, Italy
- Ponti sul Mincio, a province of Mantua, Lombardy, Italy

== People ==
- Ponti, a person who comes from Pontelandolfo, a village in Italy
- Carlo Ponti (photographer) (1823–1893), Italian photographer
- Carlo Ponti (1912–2007), Italian film producer
- Carlo Ponti Jr. (born 1968), Italian orchestral conductor, son of Carlo Ponti
- Cassandra Ponti (born 1980), Indian-Filipino actress
- Cinzia De Ponti (born 1960), Italian actress, model and television personality
- Edoardo Ponti (born 1973), Italian film director and producer
- Ettore Ponti (1855–1919), Italian politician
- Gianluca De Ponti (born 1952), Italian professional footballer
- Gio Ponti (1891–1979), Italian architect and designer
- Jack Ponti (born 1958), American musician, songwriter and record producer
- Marco Ponti (born 1967), Italian film director
- Michael Ponti (1937–2022), German pianist
- Ryan Ponti (born 1998), Malagasy footballer

== See also ==
- Pont (disambiguation)
- Ponte (disambiguation)
- Ponto (disambiguation)
- Ponty (disambiguation)
- Ponzi
