= Whitebridge =

Whitebridge or White's Bridge may refer to:

== Places ==
- White's Bridge, an historic bridge crossing the Flat River in Michigan
- Whitebridge, New South Wales, a suburb of the city of Lake Macquarie
- Whitebridge, Scotland, a small village in the Highlands of Scotland, near Loch Ness

== Art, entertainment, and media ==
- Whitebridge (Wheel of Time), a fictional town in the nation of Andor, in Robert Jordan's The Wheel of Time series

== See also ==
- Black Bridge (disambiguation)
- Negroponte (disambiguation)
- White Bridge (disambiguation)
