= Dupond =

Dupond may refer to:

- Patrick Dupond
- Éric Dupond-Moretti
- Dupont et Dupond

== See also ==
- Dupont (disambiguation)
