= Isaac Owens House =

Historic house in Washington, D.C., United States

- U.S. National Register of Historic Places
- U.S. Historic district – Contributing property
- D.C. Inventory of Historic Sites
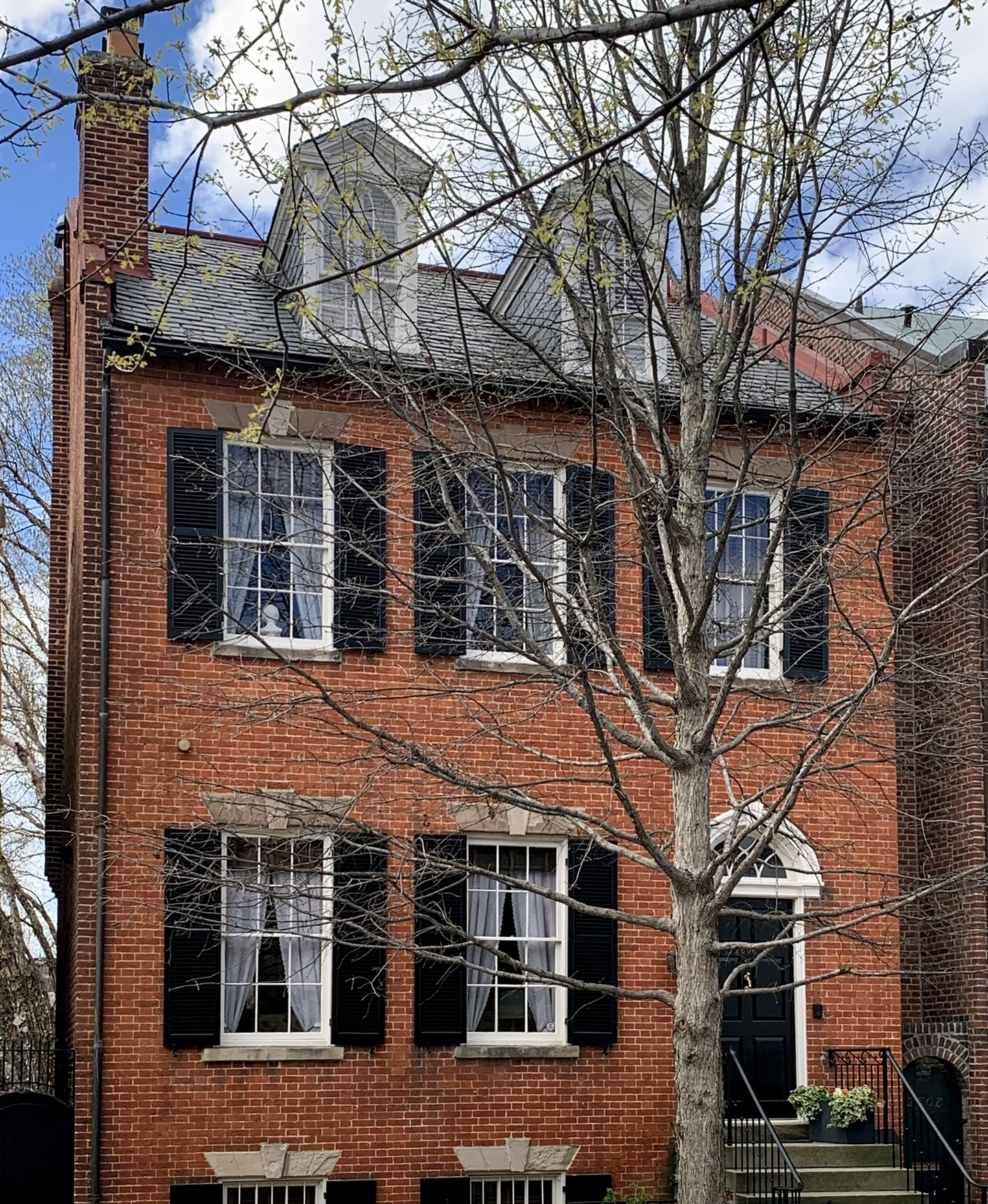
- Isaac Owens House in 2022

- Location within Washington, D.C.
- Location: 2806 N Street, N.W. Washington, D.C.
- Coordinates: 38°54′24″N 77°3′29″W
- Built: 1816
- Architectural style: Federal
- Part of: Georgetown Historic District (ID67000025)
- NRHP reference No.: 73002107

Significant dates
- Added to NRHP: June 19, 1973
- Designated DCIHS: November 8, 1964

Isaac Owens House, also known as the Gannt-Williams House or John Walker House, is a historic building located at 2806 N Street NW Washington, D.C., in the Georgetown neighborhood.

== History ==
The row house was constructed in 1816, and is an example of Federal architecture. John W. Lumsden bought the house in 1856. Katherine B. Cunningham bought the house in 1921. Drew Pearson lived there in 1927. John Walker bought the house in 1940.

The Isaac Owens House is listed on the National Register of Historic Places, and is a contributing property to the Georgetown Historic District. Its 2009 property value is $2,935,970.

== See also ==
- John Stoddert Haw House
