= USS Du Pont (TB-7) =

Torpedo boat of the United States Navy

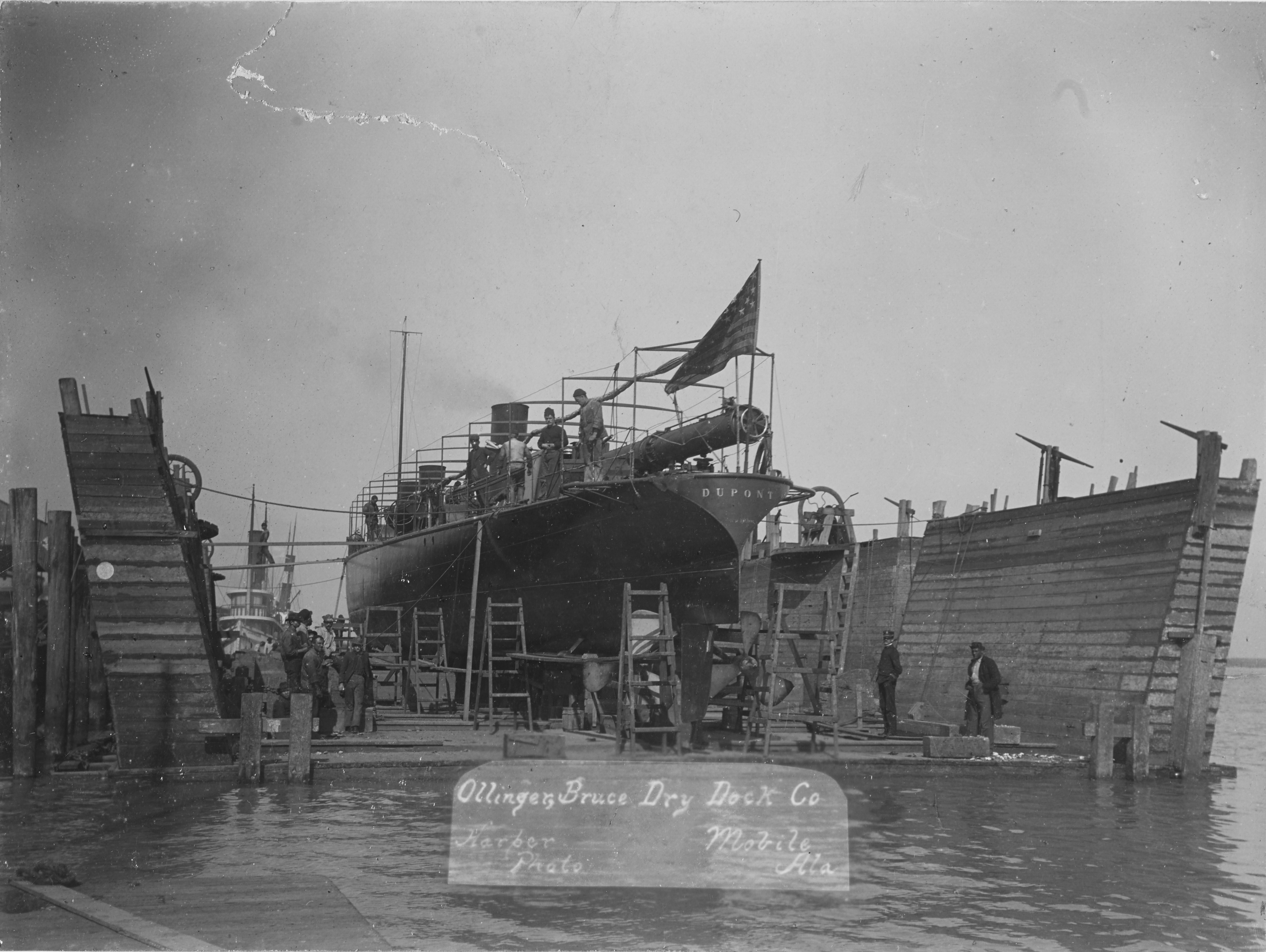
- USS Du Pont (TB-7) in a floating drydock at the Ollinger, Bruce Dry Dock Co., Mobile, Alabama, 18 February 1898.

History

United States
- Namesake: Samuel Francis Du Pont
- Ordered: 2 March 1895
- Builder: Herreshoff Manufacturing Co., Bristol, Rhode Island
- Laid down: February 1896
- Launched: 30 March 1897
- Sponsored by: Miss L. Converse
- Commissioned: 23 September 1897
- Decommissioned: 8 March 1919
- Renamed: Coast Torpedo Boat No. 3, 1 August 1918
- Stricken: 6 November 1919
- Identification: TB-7
- Fate: Sold, 19 July 1920

General characteristics
- Class & type: Porter-class torpedo boat
- Displacement: 165 long tons (168 t)
- Length: 175 ft 6 in (53.49 m)
- Beam: 17 ft 9 in (5.41 m)
- Draft: 4 ft 8 in (1.42 m) (mean)
- Installed power: 3 × Normand boilers; 3,200 ihp (2,386 kW)
- Propulsion: vertical quadruple expansion engines; 2 × screw propellers
- Speed: 28 knots (52 km/h; 32 mph); 28.58 kn (32.89 mph; 52.93 km/h) (Speed on Trial)
- Complement: 24 officers and enlisted
- Armament: 4 × 1-pounder (37 mm (1.46 in)) guns; 3 × 18 inch (450 mm) torpedo tubes (3x1)

The first USS Du Pont (Torpedo Boat No.7/TB-7/Coast Torpedo Boat No. 3) was launched 30 March 1897 by Herreshoff Manufacturing Co., Bristol, R.I.; sponsored by Miss L. Converse; and commissioned 23 September 1897, Lieutenant (junior grade) Spencer S. Wood in command.

Du Pont operated on the east coast, carrying dispatches and training Naval Reservists until the outbreak of the Spanish–American War. She carried orders and messages to ships lying at Dry Tortugas and Key West, Fla., and served on picket and patrol duty off Key West and Matanzas and Santiago, Cuba. She returned to New York 9 August 1898.

Arriving at Newport, Rhode Island 4 November 1898, Du Pont was placed out of commission 4 days later. She remained at Newport out of commission, employed occasionally in experimental and training duty. From 1901 to 1909 she was based at Norfolk, Virginia in the Reserve Torpedo Flotilla. During this time she was in commission twice: From September 1903 to September 1904 as a training ship at the Naval Academy, and from June 1905 to June 1906 for operations with the Coast Squadron on the Atlantic coast and in the Gulf of Mexico.

Recommissioned 14 May 1909 Du Pont cruised along the coast with the Atlantic Torpedo Fleet until placed in reserve again at Charleston Navy Yard in November 1909. From May 1910 to June 1911 she served the North Carolina Naval Militia, and after lying in Newport from October 1911 to May 1914, was loaned to the Naval Militia of Massachusetts 10 June 1914.

With the entry of the United States into World War I Du Pont was recommissioned 9 April 1917 and assigned to duty in the 2d Naval District. The following year she was attached to Patrol Squadron, New London Section, for duty in Narragansett Bay. From 1 August 1918 she was known as Coast Torpedo Boat No. 3 to release the name Du Pont for new construction. She arrived at Philadelphia Navy Yard 24 January 1919, was decommissioned there 8 March 1919, and sold 19 July 1920.

== Bibliography ==
- Eger, Christopher L. (March 2021). "Hudson Fulton Celebration, Part II". Warship International. LVIII (1): 58–81. ISSN 0043-0374.
- Additional technical data from Gardiner, Robert (1979). Conway's All The World's Fighting Ships 1860–1905. Conway Maritime Press. p. 160. ISBN 0-85177-133-5.
