= Black River Bridge =

Black River Bridge may refer to:

- Black River Bridge, New Brunswick
- Black River Bridge (Carrizo, Arizona), listed on the National Register of Historic Places in Gila County, Arizona
- Black River Bridge (Pocahontas, Arkansas), listed on the National Register of Historic Places in Randolph County, Arkansas
