= Dupont =

Dupont, DuPont, Du Pont, duPont, or du Pont may refer to:

== People ==
- Dupont (surname), a surname of French origin
- du Pont family, one of the wealthiest families in the United States

== Companies ==
- DuPont, a producer of products for the healthcare, water, construction and industrial markets
- Du Pont Motors, a marine engine and automobile manufacturer from 1919 to 1931
- Dupont Brewery, a brewery in Belgium

== Places in the United States ==
- Dupont, Colorado, an unincorporated community
- Du Pont, Georgia, a town
- Dupont, Indiana, a town
- Dupont, Pointe Coupee Parish, Louisiana, an unincorporated community
- Dupont, Ohio, a village
- Dupont, Pennsylvania, a borough
- Dupont, Tennessee, a community
- DuPont, Washington, a city
- Dupont, Wisconsin, a town
- DuPont State Forest, North Carolina
- Fort DuPont, Delaware

== Transportation ==
- Dupont station, a subway station in Toronto, Canada
- DuPont station, a planned Sounder commuter rail station in DuPont, Washington, US
- Dupont Circle station, a subway station in Washington, D.C., US

== Other uses ==
- USS Du Pont, three US Navy ships
- duPont Manual High School, Louisville, Kentucky
- Tour DuPont, a former bicycle race

== See also ==
- DuPont analysis, a financial analysis tool
- DuPont connector, a form of electrical connector
- Dupond (disambiguation)
- Pont (disambiguation)
- DuMont Television Network
