= Siege of Negroponte =

Siege of Negroponte can refer to one of two sieges of the town of Chalkis in Greece (medieval Negroponte):

- Siege of Negroponte (1257–58), 13-month siege of Negroponte by the Venetians and their allies
- Siege of Negroponte (1351) by the Genoese
- Siege of Negroponte (1470) by the Ottoman Turks
- Siege of Negroponte (1688) by the Venetians

== See also ==
- Siege of Euripos
