= White Bridge (Stonehaven) =

19th century bridge in Aberdeenshire, Scotland

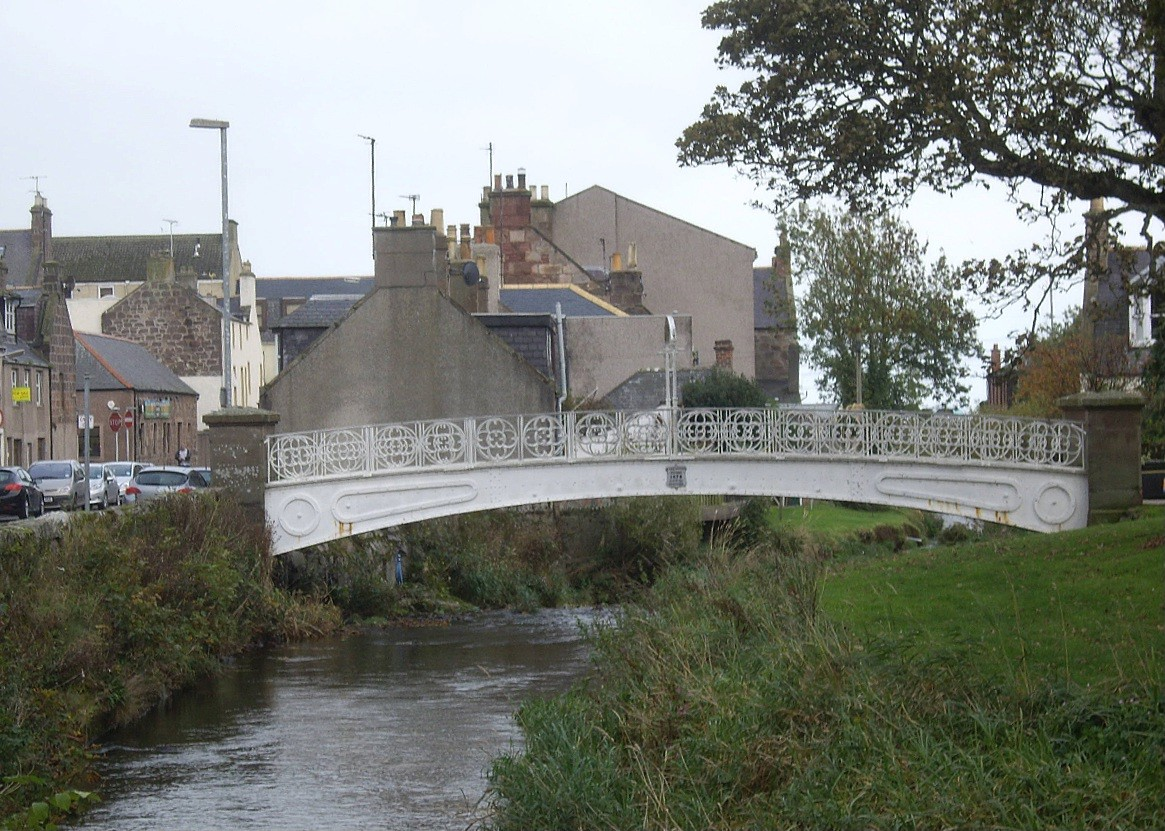
- White Bridge in 2011
- Coordinates: 56.96290°N 2.21047°W
- OS grid reference: NO 87300 85760
- Crosses: Carron Water
- Locale: Aberdeenshire

Characteristics
- Design: Arch
- No. of spans: 1

History
- Construction end: 1879

Listed Building – Category C(S)
- Official name: Arbuthnott Street, White Bridge
- Designated: 25 November 1980
- Reference no.: LB41553

Location
- Interactive map of White Bridge

The White Bridge is a footbridge in Stonehaven, Scotland. It was constructed in 1879. It was built with a wooden floor which was replaced with concrete in 1892. The bridge is Category C listed.

The bridge crosses the Carron Water and links Arbuthnott Street and Cameron Street.

In April 2019, the bridge was removed and placed into storage as part of flood prevention works in Stonehaven. The bridge was subsequently refurbished with its paint removed and replaced. It reopened in September 2023.

== See also ==
- List of bridges in Scotland
