= Ponte =

Ponte, a word meaning bridge in Italian, Portuguese, and Galician languages, may refer to:

== Places ==
=== England ===
- Pontefract, a town in the Metropolitan City of Wakefield

=== France ===
- Ponte Leccia, a civil parish (hameau) in the department of Haute-Corse

=== Italy ===
Municipalities

- Ponte (BN), in the Province of Benevento
- Ponte Buggianese, in the Province of Pistoia
- Ponte dell'Olio, in the Province of Piacenza
- Ponte di Legno, in the Province of Brescia
- Ponte di Piave, in the Province of Treviso
- Ponte Gardena, Italian name for Waidbruck, in South Tyrol
- Ponte in Valtellina, in the Province of Sondrio
- Ponte Lambro, in the Province of Como
- Ponte nelle Alpi, in the Province of Belluno
- Ponte Nizza, in the Province of Provincia di Pavia
- Ponte Nossa, in the Province of Bergamo
- Ponte San Nicolò, in the Province of Padua
- Ponte San Pietro, in the Province of Bergamo

Civil parishes and quarters

- Ponte (Rome), a rione in the City of Rome
- Ponte di Cerreto, in the Province of Perugia

=== Portugal ===
- Ponte da Barca, a municipality in the District of Viana do Castelo
- Ponte de Lima, a municipality in the District of Viana do Castelo
- Ponte de Sor, a municipality in the District of Portalegre
- Ponte (Guimarães), a freguesia of the municipality of Guimarães

=== South Africa ===
- Ponte Tower, a landmark city apartment building in Johannesburg

=== Switzerland ===
- Ponte Capriasca, a municipality in the Canton of Ticino
- Ponte Tresa, a municipality in the Canton of Ticino

== Other uses ==
- Ponte (surname), list of people with the surname
- Il Ponte, political and literary magazine in Milan
- Ponte (Fabric), a knit fabric

== See also ==
- Negroponte (disambiguation)
- Pont (disambiguation)
- Ponti (disambiguation)
- Ponto (disambiguation)
- Ponty (disambiguation)
- Ponzi
