= Joseph C. Harsch =

American journalist (1905–1998)

- Born: May 25, 1905; Toledo, Ohio
- Died: June 3, 1998 (aged 93); Jamestown, Rhode Island
- Education: Williams College, Corpus Christi College, Cambridge
- Occupation: Journalist
- Years active: 1929–1998
- Known for: Reporting on World War II and international affairs

Joseph C. Harsch (May 25, 1905 – June 3, 1998) was an American newspaper, radio, and television journalist. He spent more than sixty years writing for The Christian Science Monitor and at the time of his departure from his stationing in London he was named as a Commander of the Order of the British Empire (CBE Hon).

== Early life ==
Joseph Close Harsch was born in Toledo, Ohio, the son of Paul Harsch, a real estate salesman, and his wife Leila Close. When Paul Harsch became a Christian Scientist, he raised his sons in the faith, which would lead to a career-long affiliation for Harsch as a reporter. Joseph Harsch studied history at Williams College in Massachusetts, where he received a master's degree in 1927 after writing a thesis on the Hundred Years' War. Later, he traveled to Corpus Christi College, Cambridge where he received another master's degree from Cambridge University in 1929. Later that same year, Harsch went to work as a reporter for the Christian Science Monitor in Washington, D.C.

== Early reporting ==
At the outset of the Great Depression, Harsch was a newly hired young reporter at the Monitor in Washington, D.C. covering Herbert Hoover as the magnitude of the economic crisis began to unfold, and was still there when Franklin D. Roosevelt introduced the New Deal with measures to counteract it. In 1939, Harsch was in London when Neville Chamberlain declared war on Germany. It was the beginning of a number of first-hand accounts of events that shaped history. His reporting from Berlin at the start of World War II made him the first journalist to cover the conflict from both the Allied and Axis sides

== Historic event coverage ==
Shortly after England's declaration of war, Harsch traveled to Berlin, where his reporting made him the first to cover World War II from both sides. On his way to the Soviet Union during a stopover in Hawaii, Harsch and his wife were asleep when the Japanese attack on Pearl Harbor began. He often repeated the story of how he awakened his wife in their hotel room, saying "Listen to this, dear. You have often asked me what an air raid sound like. This is a good imitation."

Incredibly, Harsch found himself in Australia following General Douglas MacArthur's failed defense of the Philippines, and was present to record MacArthur's prophetic pledge, "I shall return."

He met General Dwight D. Eisenhower in France. During the capture of Albert Speer in Glücksburg Castle (Speer was Adolf Hitler's Minister of Armaments and War Production) Harsch translated for a British officer leading the arrest and he reported of the capture of Karl Dönitz in a hospital of Mürwik (Muerwik), who was the head of the Flensburg Government. Harsch also reported from the Nazi concentration camps in 1945 when the Allied forces made their advance, and in the early years of the so-called Cold War, Harsch correctly predicted that the Iron Curtain would eventually fall along with the Soviet bloc. His own newspaper reported in his obituary that "He seemed to be everywhere, or at least everywhere something important was happening."

== Broadcasting ==
Harsch made his first broadcasts during the time he was in Berlin as bureau chief for the Christian Science Monitor, filling in sporadically for William L. Shirer who was the noted Berlin correspondent for CBS. After Harsch returned to the United States, he joined CBS in 1943. For the next six years Harsch broadcast his news analysis on WTOP, Washington D.C. in addition to writing a column for the Monitor.

Because of his background in London, Harsch was hired by the BBC when influential broadcaster Raymond Gram Swing gave up his post with the weekly radio program American Commentary. Harsch alternated his coverage from Washington with Clifton Utley, who reported from Chicago.

In 1953, Harsch shifted his allegiance to NBC, serving as a news analyst for four years before returning to London as the senior European correspondent for the network. He became so well known in London circles that he was invited to dine with the Queen, was a popular member of the Garrick Club and many other social fixtures. When he left England, he was made a Commander of the Order of the British Empire by Queen Elizabeth II.

ABC became his broadcast home in 1967, when he was a commentator for the network until 1971, assigned to the American Entertainment Network effective 1/1/68.

During the course of his broadcasting career, he continued to write his newspaper column, and his efforts for the Monitor that helped establish its reputation in foreign affairs coverage were celebrated in 1989 on the 60th anniversary of his column.

== Personal life ==
Harsch's father Paul Harsch became a Christian Science teacher and lecturer, and gave the first ever lecture on the religion in the Jerusalem.

Joseph C. Harsch married Anne Elizabeth Wood, the daughter of retired United States Navy Rear Admiral Spencer S. Wood, and maintained a home in Jamestown, Rhode Island. The couple had three sons and remained married for 65 years, before Anne's death in 1997.

On the evening before Harsch's 93rd birthday and a month before his death, he married Edna Raemer, his editorial assistant of 25 years. She had moved to Jamestown to help in the editing on a history project being written by Harsch.

== Works ==
Harsch authored several books related to the European conflict, including Pattern of Conquest (1941), an analysis of the Nazi threat before the U.S. entry into the war, and The Curtain isn't Iron (1950), about the Soviet bloc and the Cold War. His memoir, At the Hinge of History: a Reporter's Story (1993) won praise for him late in his life.

== Accolades ==
In 1951, Harsch received the Alfred I. duPont Award. The $1,000 award for his work with the Liberty Broadcasting System cited Harsch's "consistently excellent and accurate gathering and reporting of news by radio". In 1965 he was made an honorary Commander of the Order of the British Empire (CBE Hon).
