= Ponty vineyards =

Coordinates: 44.920751°N 0.274984°W

Ponty Vineyards
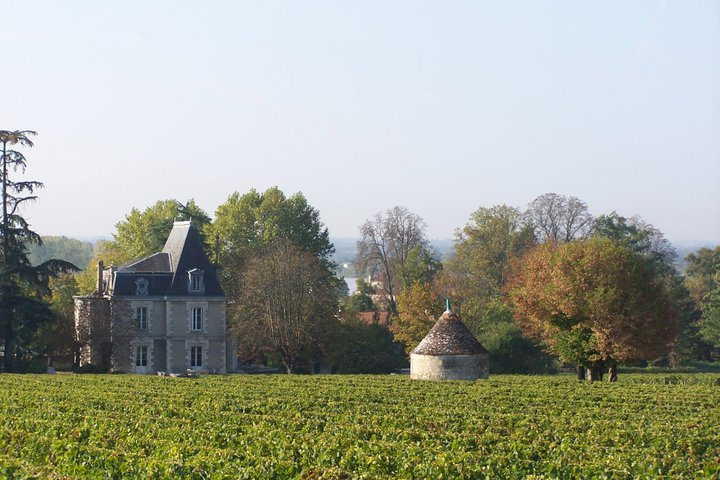
- Location: Gironde, France
- Wine region: Bordeaux
- Founded: 1905
- Key people: Victor Ponty, Michel Ponty, Jean Ponty, Francois Ponty
- Known for: Chateau Grand Renouil
- Varietals: Merlot, Cabernet Franc
- Website: pontyvineyards.com/

Ponty Vineyards, also known as Vignobles Ponty, is a wine estate of Bordeaux wine in the Canon Fronsac appellation located on the right bank of the river Garonne, 25 km away from Bordeaux, close to the city of Libourne. Close to the Pomerol and Saint-Emilion regions, Canon Fronsac’s landscape of plateaus and hills snuggle into the confluence of two rivers: the Isle and the Dordogne. Winemaking has been the family business for the Ponty family for more than five generations. The vineyard currently produces five wines: Chateau Grand Renouil, Chateau du Pavillon, Petit Renouil, Clos Virolle, and Blanc de Grand Renouil.

== Region ==
Canon Fronsac's location, close to the river Dordogne and the city of Libourne, with its hills allowing to spot attackers, made it an ideal military camp in the past. In 769 Charlemagne decided to use it to build a stronghold. In 1623 the castle was destroyed and the land given to the Cardinal of Richelieu . In the 18th century, his heir, the Duke of Richelieu had an Italian-style mansion built on the hills of Canon Fronsac. There, he housed parties and contributed to making Fronsac's wines famous. The castle remained in Richelieu's family until the French revolution, when the domain was confiscated.

Canon Fronsac wines were very famous in the 17th and 18th century, when the Duke of Richelieu brought them repeatedly to the court of the King of France, over time reserving the whole harvest of Canon Fronsac wine for the nobility.

Canon Fronsac is known for the quality of its soils: the "molasse du Fronsadais" found in the soils of Saint Emilion is named after the region. Many Canon Fronsac vineyards are located on hillsides facing the river Dordogne on the South. Mainly made of chalky "plateau" where the stone often shows on the surface and of clay-chalky hillsides, Canon Fronsac's soils are complete with an microclimate due to its proximity to the Dordogne. Besides the oceanic climate, the Fronsac soils benefit from an Indian summer during the harvest time.

== History ==
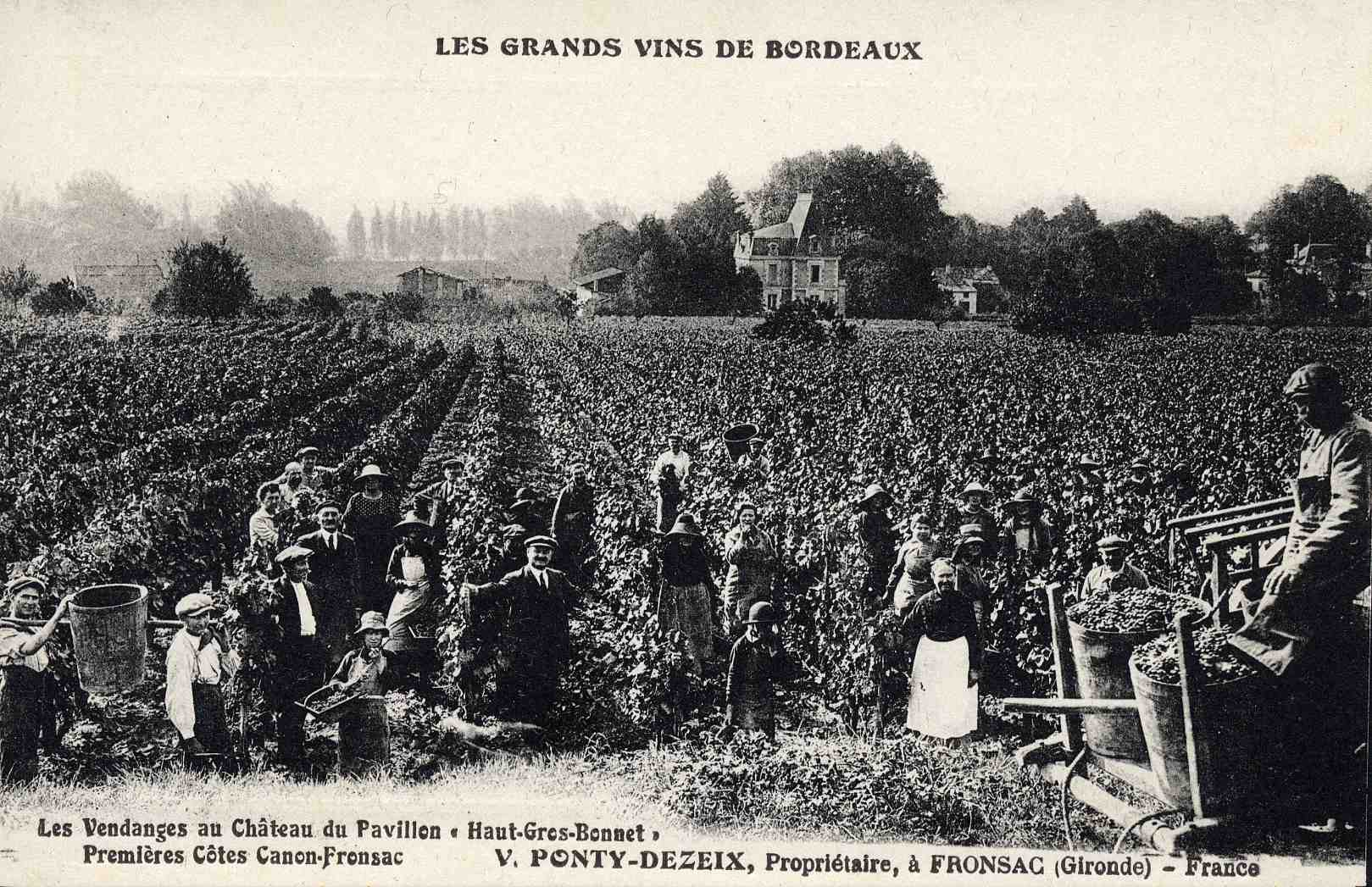
old picture of chateau du pavillon

The Ponty family have been producing wine in Canon Fronsac since 1905, when Victor Ponty discovered the potential of wines produced in the appellation. In 1905, Victor Ponty, born in a family of farmers in the French region of Corrèze, settled in Fronsac, a small village not far from Bordeaux, where he started commercializing wine with the help of his wife's family, the Dezeix.

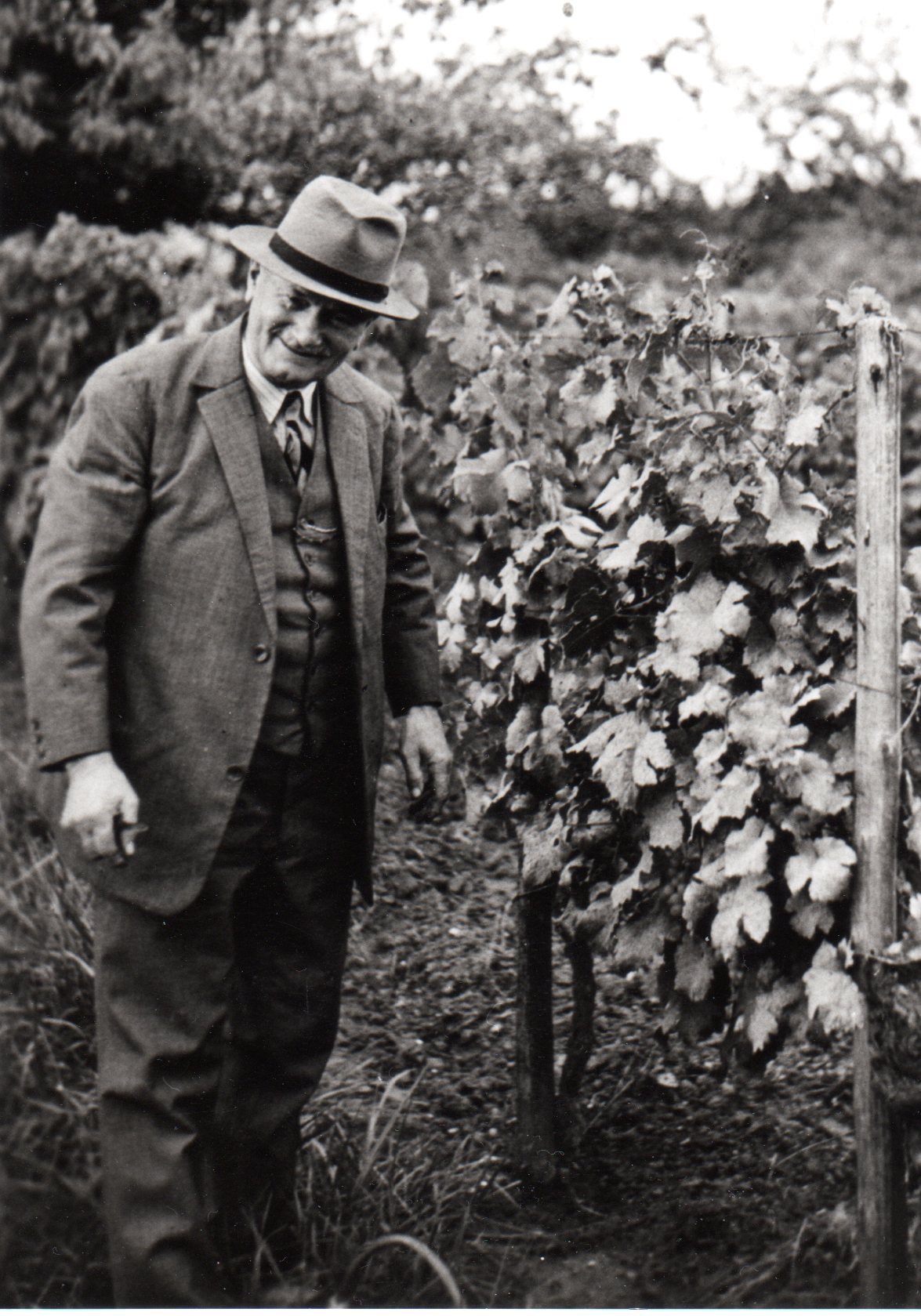
victor ponty

In 1925 Victor bought the Château du Pavillon in Canon Fronsac and moved in with his family. He and his wife Elizabeth gave birth to a son, Jean Ponty, who started working with his father early on and developed the company's clientele in Normandy. Jean later marries Jeanne Labegorre, from the Bearn region of France, and they together decide to buy the Château Grand Renouil in Saint Michel de Fronsac in 1938. Over the years, Jean and Jeanne have 7 children. The oldest son, Jean-François, gradually replaces Victor and Jean as head of the family company and in the winemaking process. He then brings on Michel, the youngest son, to learn the family business and share his passion for wine.

In 1986, Michel becomes solely in charge of the company after François retires. In 1989, Michel and his wife Nadine Couraud bought a small estate that they rename Blanc de Grand Renouil.

The Ponty family are involved in the Canon Fronsac association of winegrowers, to raise awareness of Canon Fronsac wines that were famous in the 18th century.

== Wines ==
Merlot is the dominant grape variety in Canon Fronsac, giving its wine a structure and richness, but Cabernet Franc and Cabernet Sauvignon grape varieties are also produced in the region. Canon Fronsac wines are known to be elegant, sophisticated, and keep strong tannins. The aromas of the wine include red fruits, berries and spices, as well as truffles for older wines. Canon Fronsac wines are known to pair well with red meat, roasted chicken or duck and cheese.

The Ponty family hand picks their grapes and allows their wines to express its flavors through time during the vinification process. The family lives on the estate to care for the vines' entire growth cycle, and protect the soils they live on using sustainable development farming practices.

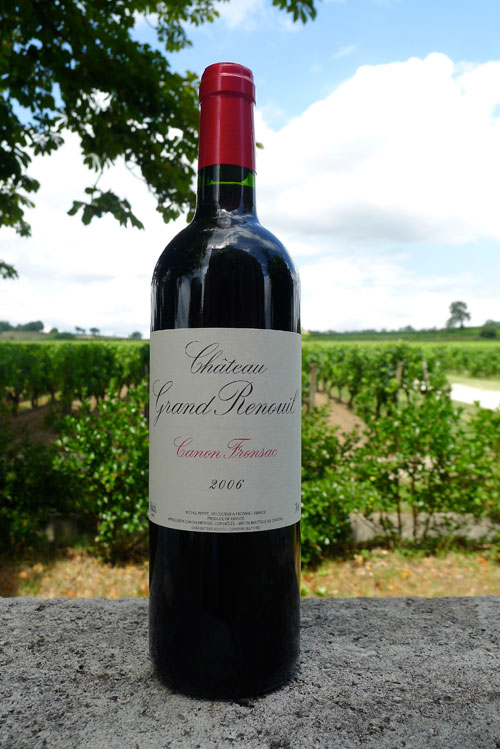
Bottle of Chateau Grand Renouil Wine

The vineyard currently produces five wines: Chateau Grand Renouil, Chateau du Pavillon, Petit Renouil, Clos Virolle, and Blanc de Grand Renouil.
