= Fra Antonio da Negroponte =

Italian painter

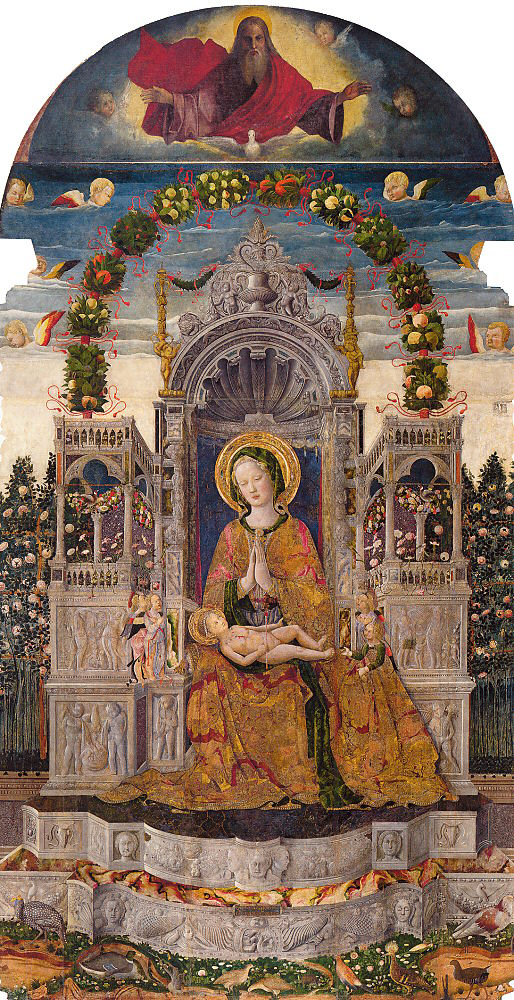
Antonio da negroponte

Fra Antonio da Negroponte was an Italian painter of the early-Renaissance period, active mainly in Padua and Venice. He painted in a Quattrocento style that resembles that of Bartolomeo Vivarini. Among his works are a Madonna and Child Enthroned for a chapel in the church of San Francesco della Vigna in Venice.
