= Ponto Lake =

Lake in the state of Minnesota, United States

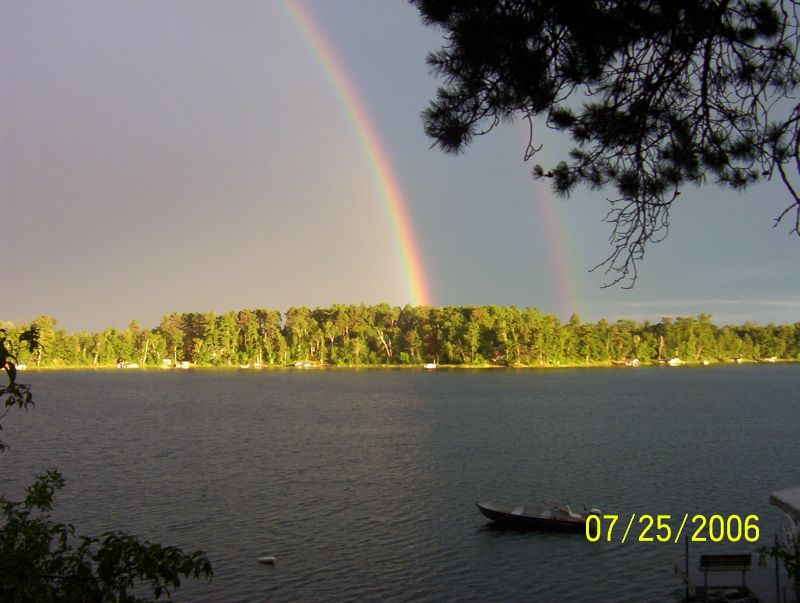
- Rainbow over Ponto

- Location within Minnesota Location within the United States
- Location: Cass County, Minnesota, United States
- Coordinates: 46°52′26″N 94°20′28″W
- Basin countries: United States
- Surface area: 347 acres (140 ha)
- Max. depth: 60 ft (18 m)
- Surface elevation: 1,333 ft (406 m)

Ponto Lake is a 347-acre (1.40 km^{2}) lake located 2 miles (3.2 km) north and 8 miles (13 km) east of Backus, Minnesota.

A public access is located on the southeast shore just north of State Highway 84. The Minnesota Department of Natural Resources (MNDNR) has classified Minnesota's lakes into 43 different classes based on physical, chemical and other characteristics. Ponto Lake is in Lake Class 23; lakes in this class generally have hard water, are very deep and clear, and have a low amount of lake area less than 15 feet deep. This lake is managed primarily for walleye and northern pike and secondarily for bluegill, black crappie, largemouth bass, and yellow perch.

Ponto Lake has an abundant population of naturally reproducing walleye. The average length of these walleye was 17 inches (43 cm), and the largest sampled was 27 inches (69 cm). Northern pike were also abundant, averaged about 18 inches (46 cm) long, and had a maximum length of 37 inches (94 cm). Ponto Lake has a good population of largemouth bass, and fish up to 16 inches (41 cm) were sampled. Bluegill, black crappie and yellow perch are available for anglers, however numbers sampled in the 2002 assessment were low.
