= USS Porter (TB-6) =

Torpedo boat of the United States Navy

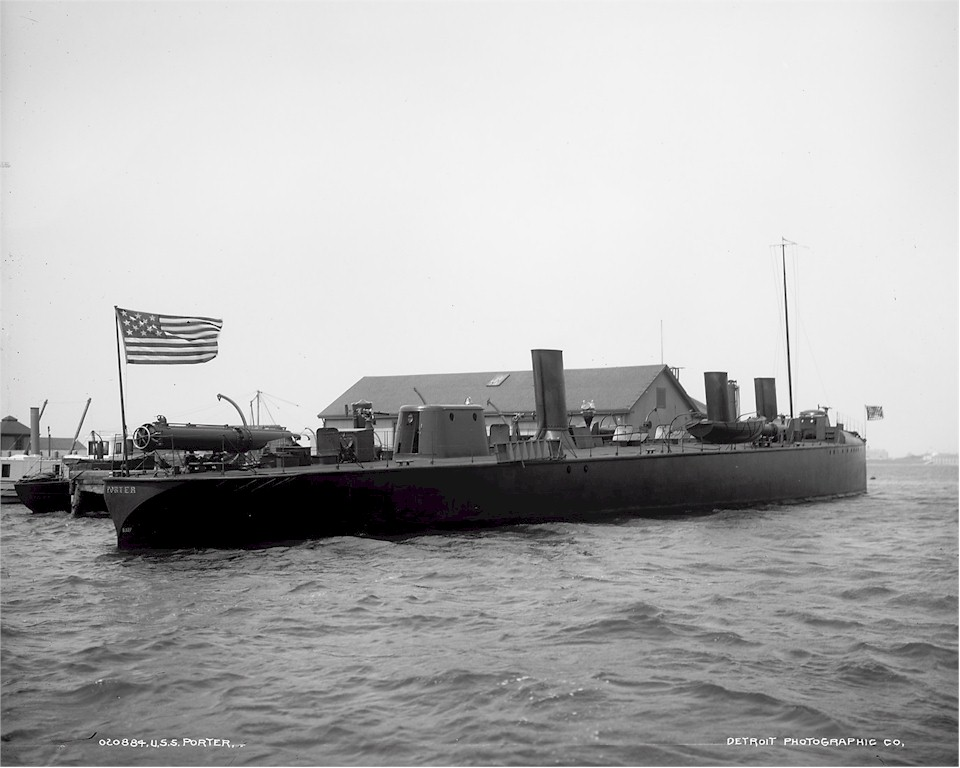
- USS Porter (TB-6), October 3, 1897.

History

United States
- Name: Porter
- Namesake: Commodore David Porter; Admiral David Dixon Porter
- Ordered: 2 March 1895
- Builder: Herreshoff Manufacturing Co., Bristol, Rhode Island
- Laid down: February 1896
- Launched: 9 September 1896
- Sponsored by: Miss Agnes M. Herreshoff
- Commissioned: 20 February 1897
- Decommissioned: 1912
- Stricken: 6 November 1912
- Identification: TB-6
- Fate: Sold, 30 December 1912

General characteristics
- Class & type: Porter-class torpedo boat
- Displacement: 165 long tons (168 t)
- Length: 175 ft 6 in (53.49 m)
- Beam: 17 ft 9 in (5.41 m)
- Draft: 4 ft 8 in (1.42 m) (mean)
- Installed power: 3 × Normand boilers; 3,200 ihp (2,386 kW)
- Propulsion: vertical quadruple expansion engines; 2 × screw propellers
- Speed: 29 knots (54 km/h; 33 mph); 28.63 kn (32.95 mph; 53.02 km/h) (Speed on Trial)
- Complement: 32 officers and enlisted
- Armament: 4 × 1-pounder (37 mm (1.46 in)) guns; 3 × 18 inch (450 mm) torpedo tubes (3x1)

USS Porter (Torpedo Boat No. 6/TB-6) was a torpedo boat, the first of her class, launched in 1896, served during the Spanish–American War, and struck in 1912. She was the first Navy ship named for Commodore David Porter, and his son, Admiral David Dixon Porter.

Porter was laid down in February 1896 by Herreshoff Manufacturing Co., Bristol, Rhode Island: launched on 9 September 1896, sponsored by Miss Agnes M. Herreshoff; and commissioned on 20 February 1897 at Newport, R.I.

== Service history ==
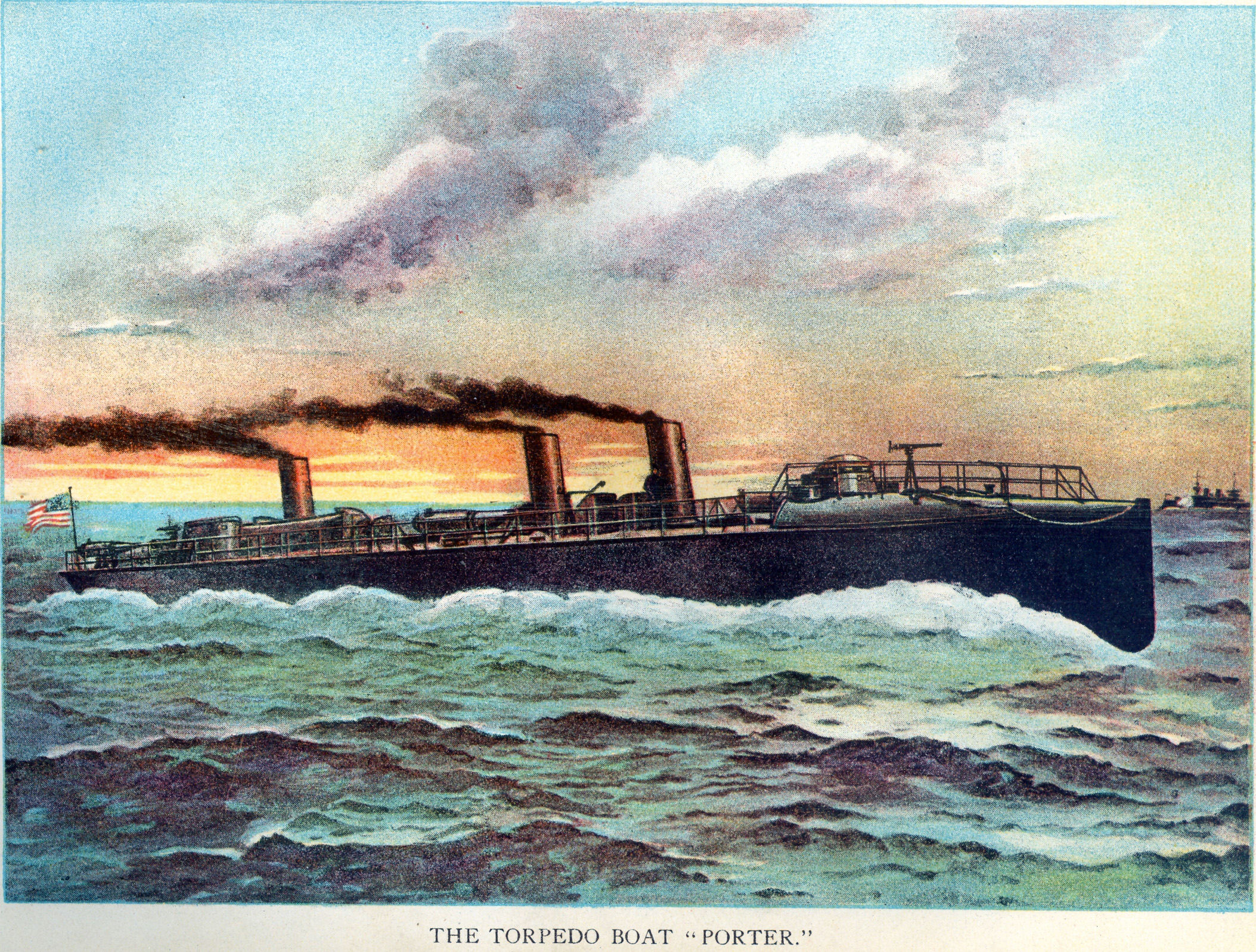
Illustration of Porter at sea, 1898.

=== Pre-Spanish–American War ===
Porter sailed to Washington, D.C., on 27 February 1897 for inspection and was further examined on 16–20 March at New York by the Chief of the Bureau of Navigation. She operated between New London and Newport; then visited New York from 15 July-3 October before getting underway for her winter port, Charleston, South Carolina. Porter cruised in southern waters until 8 December and then proceeded to Key West where she was stationed from 1–22 January 1898.

=== Spanish–American War ===
Porter arrived on 26 January at Mobile on 26 January for a visit, but she was ordered to return to Key West on 6 March because of the tense situation in Cuba. When the United States declared war upon Spain, she was already patrolling the waters off Key West and the Dry Tortugas. Porter returned to Key West on 22 March for replenishment on 22 March.

Porter departed Key West with the North Atlantic Fleet on 22 April for the blockade of the north coast of Cuba. She soon made contact with the enemy, capturing the Spanish schooners Sofia and Matilda on 23–24 April. After refueling at Key West from 2–7 May, Porter resumed blockade duty off Cap-Haïtien, Haiti keeping a watchful eye out for Cervera's squadron. She participated in the three-hour bombardment of San Juan on 12–13 May, along with the nine ships of Rear Admiral W. T. Sampson's fleet. During the attack, Porter maintained a close position under the batteries with the cruiser Detroit, but she was not hit.

Porter returned to the blockade of the north coast of Hispaniola on 13–14 May, cruising off Samaná Bay, Santo Domingo and off Porto Plata, Haiti. After a brief interval at Key West and Mobile from 18–25 May, she joined Commodore Schley's squadron off Santiago de Cuba from 1–11 June, where it had bottled up the elusive Spanish warships. Porter came under heavy fire on 7 June while silencing the shore batteries, but was undamaged. Later, she supported the Marine beachhead at Guantanamo Bay from 11–17 June. Porter took up her station off Santiago on 17 June and again on 21–22 June when she bombarded the Socapa battery during the landings at Daiquirí. She continued patrolling off Guantanamo until 9 July, when she left for New York via Key West. Upon her arrival at the New York Navy Yard on 19 July, Porter was placed in reduced commission and decommissioned on 5 November 1898.

=== Post-war ===
She recommissioned on 10 October 1899 at New York and served as a training ship for firemen at Newport, Norfolk and Annapolis. Porter decommissioned 21 December 1900 at New York. She was put in reserve commission in late 1901 at Norfolk with the Reserve Torpedo Flotilla and continued this duty through 1907.

Porter recommissioned at Norfolk on 31 January 1908, and was ordered to Pensacola on 21 February. As flagship of the 3rd Torpedo Flotilla, she engaged in torpedo runs in St. Joseph Bay, Florida from 4 March-22 April. Porter acted as naval escort to the remains of Governor DeWitt Clinton in New York harbor on 29 May 1908 before returning to the Reserve Torpedo Flotilla at Norfolk on 1 July.

Porter recommissioned on 14 May 1909 at Charleston, South Carolina, Lt. Harold R. Stark in command, and was assigned to the 3rd Division, Atlantic Torpedo Flotilla. She proceeded to Provincetown, Massachusetts on 10 June for fleet exercises that lasted until 5 August. Porter departed on 28 August for Hampton Roads and the Southern Drill Grounds, later joining the fleet at New York for the Hudson-Fulton Celebration from 1–10 October. She was reassigned to the Reserve Torpedo Flotilla at Charleston on 14 November, where she remained until October 1911.

On 30 October 1911, Porter sailed for New York on where she took part in the fleet naval review for President Theodore Roosevelt on 2 November. The President had ordered the mobilization "to test the preparedness of the fleet and the efficiency of our organization on the ships in the yards." Afterward, Porter returned to the Reserve Torpedo Flotilla at Philadelphia. She was mobilized in October 1912 for another review at New York which was inspected by the President on 15 October.

=== Fate ===
Porter was struck from the Naval Vessel Register on 6 November 1912 and was sold to Andrew Olsen on 30 December 1912 at New York.

== Bibliography ==
- Eger, Christopher L. (March 2021). "Hudson Fulton Celebration, Part II". Warship International. LVIII (1): 58–81. ISSN 0043-0374.
- Additional technical data from Gardiner, Robert (1979). Conway's All the World's Fighting Ships 1860–1905. Conway Maritime Press. p. 160. ISBN 0-85177-133-5.
