= Pont =

Pont, meaning "bridge" in French, may refer to:

== Places ==
=== France ===
- Pont, Côte-d'Or, in the Côte-d'Or département
- Pont-Bellanger, in the Calvados département
- Pont-d'Ouilly, in the Calvados département
- Pont-Farcy, in the Calvados département
- Pont-l'Évêque, Calvados, in the Calvados département
- Pont-l'Évêque, Oise, in the Oise département

=== Elsewhere ===
- Pont, Cornwall, England
- Pontarddulais, Swansea, Wales
- Pontypridd, Rhondda Cynon Taf, Wales
- River Pont in Ponteland, Northumberland
- Du Pont, Switzerland, in the commune of L'Abbaye, Switzerland

== Other ==
- Pont (surname)
- Pont (Haiti), a political party led by Jean Marie Chérestal
- Pont Rouelle, a bridge in Paris, France
- Du Pont family
- Graham Laidler (1908–1940), British cartoonist, "Pont" of Punch magazine
- PONT, time zone abbreviation for Ponape Time (Micronesia), UTC+11:00
- Pont, Dutch for 'punt' or cable ferry

== See also ==
- Dupont (surname)
- DuPont, the company
- Dupont (disambiguation)
- Ponte (disambiguation)
- Pontus_(mythology)
