= Daniel Kearns =

Daniel Kearns may refer to:

- Daniel Kearns (footballer) (born 1991), Irish footballer
- Daniel Kearns (designer) (born 1975), Irish designer
- Daniel F. Kearns (1896–1963), American military aviator
