= Maine-class battleship =

Pre-dreadnought battleship class of the United States Navy

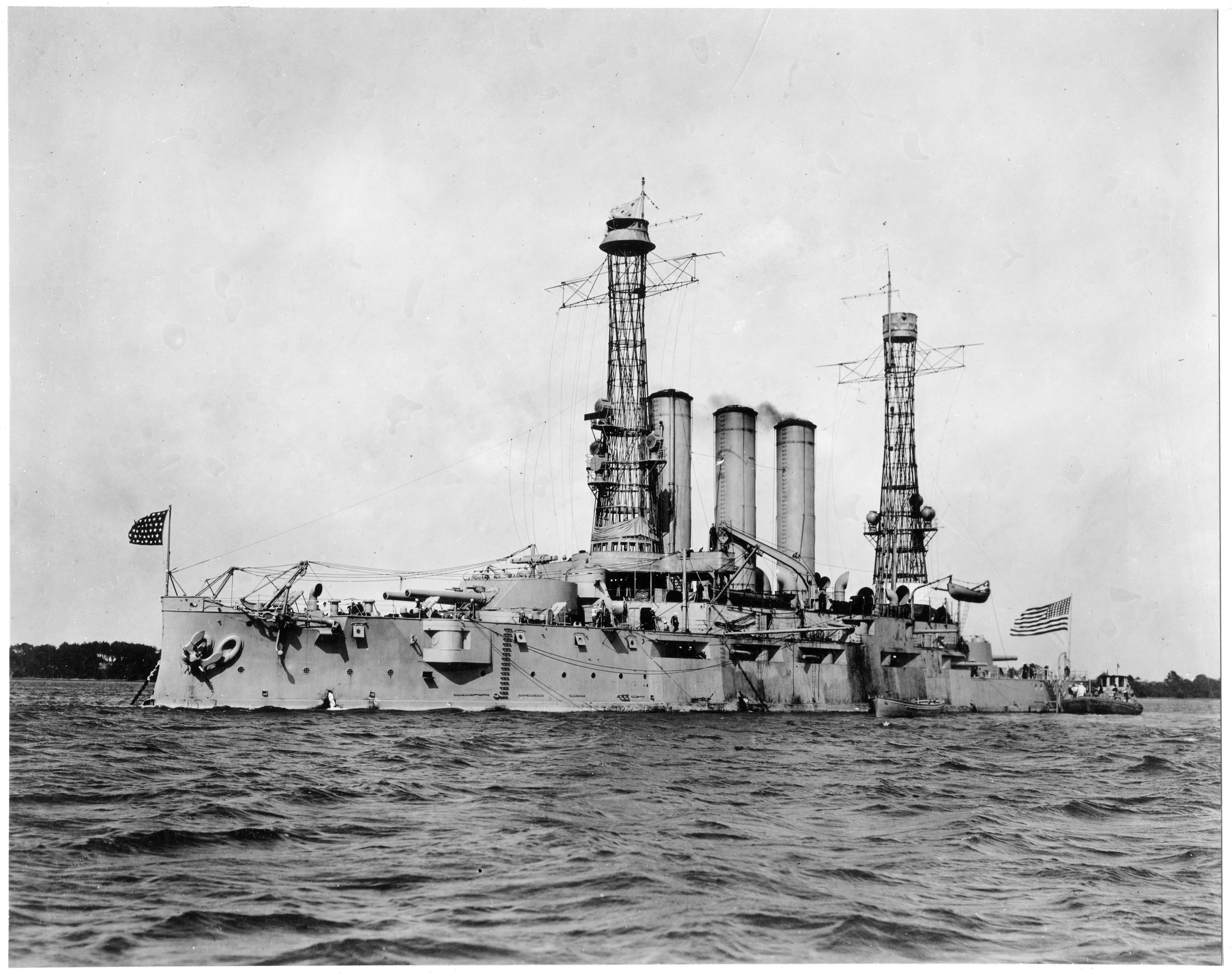
- USS Maine (BB-10) at anchor in December 1918

Class overview
- Name: Maine class
- Builders: Union Iron Works, CA (1); William Cramp & Sons, PA (1); Newport News Shipbuilding, VA (1)
- Operators: United States Navy
- Preceded by: Illinois class
- Succeeded by: Virginia class
- Built: 1899–1904
- In commission: 1902–1920
- Completed: 3
- Retired: 3

General characteristics
- Type: Pre-dreadnought battleship
- Displacement: Normal: 12,846 long tons (13,052 t); Full load: 13,700 long tons (13,900 t)
- Length: 393 ft 11 in (120.07 m)
- Beam: 72 ft 3 in (22.02 m)
- Draft: 24 ft 4 in (7.42 m)
- Installed power: 12 × Thornycroft boilers; 16,000 ihp (12,000 kW)
- Propulsion: 2 × triple-expansion steam engines; 2 × screw propellers
- Speed: 18 kn (33 km/h; 21 mph)
- Complement: 561 officers and enlisted
- Armament: 4 × 12 in (305 mm)/40 caliber Mark 3 Mod 3 guns; 16 × 6 in (152 mm)/50 cal Mark 6 guns; 8 × 3-pounders (47 mm (1.9 in)); 6 × 1-pounders (37 mm (1.5 in)); 2 × 18 in (457 mm) torpedo tubes
- Armor: Belt: 7.5 to 11 in (191 to 279 mm); Turrets: 12 in (305 mm); Casemates: 6 in (152 mm); Conning tower: 10 in (254 mm)

The three Maine-class battleships—Maine, Missouri, and Ohio—were built at the turn of the 20th century for the United States Navy. Based on the preceding Illinois class, they incorporated several significant technological advances over the earlier ships. They were the first American battleships to incorporate Krupp cemented armor, which was stronger than Harvey armor; smokeless powder, which allowed for higher-velocity guns; and water-tube boilers, which were more efficient and lighter. The Maines were armed with four 12-inch (305 mm) guns and sixteen 6-inch (152 mm) guns, and they could steam at a speed of 18 knots (33 km/h; 21 mph), a significant increase over the Illinois class.

The three Maine-class battleships served in a variety of roles throughout their careers. Maine and Missouri remained in the Atlantic Fleet for their careers, though Ohio initially served with the Asiatic Fleet from 1904 to 1907. All three ships took part in the cruise of the Great White Fleet in 1907–1909, though Maine's excessive coal consumption forced her to proceed independently for most of the voyage. Missouri was used as a training ship for much of the rest of her career, and Ohio took part in the American intervention in the Mexican Revolution in 1914. All three ships were employed as training ships during World War I. After the war, all three ships were withdrawn from service between 1919 and 1920 before being sold for scrap in 1922 and 1923 and broken up.

== Design ==
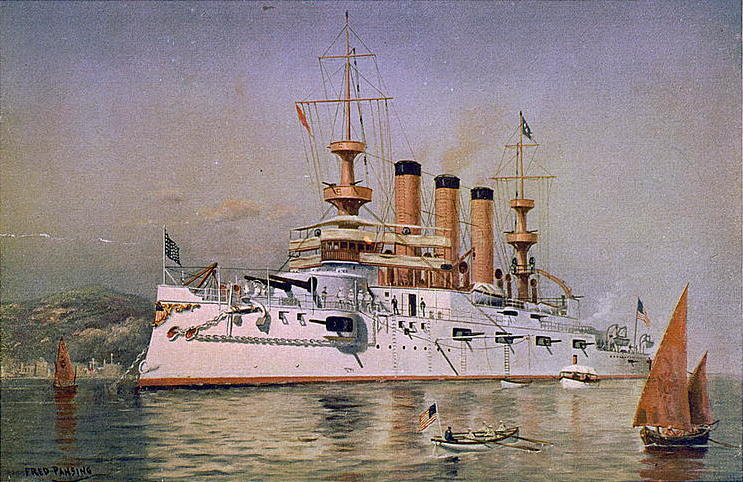
Painting of Maine, c. 1900

By 1897, the US Navy had five battleships under construction, and no plans to request additional units for 1898. With the destruction of the armored cruiser Maine in Havana harbor and the subsequent declaration of war on Spain on 25 April 1898, however, a large naval expansion program was passed through Congress. The program called for three new battleships, the first of which would be named for the destroyed Maine. Design work began immediately, though the broad parameters for the new battleships proved to be contentious. The Board on Construction advocated a design based on Iowa, to be armed with 13-, 8-, and 6-inch (330, 203, and 152 mm) guns, though others on the board argued that repeating the Illinois class, which was armed with 13 in (330 mm) and 6 in guns and had a speed of 16 knots (30 km/h; 18 mph), would save construction time. Additionally, they pointed out that 8 in guns could not be incorporated within the displacement limit.

Several important technological advances had become available by this time, however, which necessitated several changes to the design. The advent of smokeless powder permitted smaller guns with greater muzzle velocities; the Navy had accordingly designed a 12-inch (305 mm) 40-caliber high-velocity gun. In addition, Krupp cemented armor had been developed in Germany; the steel was a significant improvement over the older Harvey process. Since the steel was stronger, thinner armor plating could achieve the same level of protection and more importantly, significant savings in weight. Water-tube boilers were also now sufficiently reliable for use in warships. These were lighter and substantially more efficient than older fire-tube boilers.

Shortly after the three ships had been authorized, the Navy learned that the Russian battleship Retvizan, recently ordered from William Cramp & Sons in Philadelphia, would be capable of steaming at 18 knots (33 km/h; 21 mph), a margin of 2 knots (3.7 km/h; 2.3 mph) over the Maine design. The Navy requested that the shipyards submitting designs for the contract increase the speed of their proposed ships to match the Russian vessel. Cramp & Sons responded by lengthening the hull by 15 feet (4.6 m) to increase its fineness (and thus reduce drag) and incorporate new Niclausse boilers, while the Newport News Shipbuilding & Drydock Company lengthened the hull by 20 feet (6.1 m) and increased the horsepower of the propulsion system by sixty percent, to 16,000 indicated horsepower (12,000 kW). Ultimately, the Newport design was chosen for the new ships.

=== General characteristics and machinery ===
Plan and profile drawing of the Maine class

The ships of the Maine class were 388 feet (118 m) long at the waterline and 393 ft 11 in (120.07 m) long overall. They had a beam of 72 ft 3 in (22.02 m) and a draft of 23 ft 9 in (7.24 m) to 24 ft 4 in (7.42 m). They displaced 12,362 to 12,846 long tons (12,560 to 13,052 t) as designed and up to 13,700 long tons (13,900 t) at full load. The ships had a metacentric height of 2.36 ft (0.72 m). They had a forecastle deck that extended to the main mast. As built, they were fitted with heavy military masts with fighting tops, but these were replaced by cage masts in 1909. They had a crew of 40 officers and 521 enlisted men, which increased to 779–813 officers and men.

The ships were powered by two-shaft triple-expansion steam engines rated at 16,000 indicated horsepower (12,000 kW). Steam was provided by twelve coal-fired Thornycroft boilers for Missouri and Ohio, and twenty-four Niclausse boilers for Maine, which were trunked into three tall funnels amidships. The ships' engines generated a top speed of 18 knots (33 km/h; 21 mph), though Ohio only made 17.82 knots (33.00 km/h; 20.51 mph) on her speed trials. Normal coal capacity was 1,000 long tons (1,016 t), though Maine could carry up to 1,867 long tons (1,897 t), Missouri had capacity for 1,837 long tons (1,866 t), and Ohio could store 2,150 long tons (2,180 t) of coal. At a speed of 10 knots (19 km/h; 12 mph), the ships had a designed endurance of 4,900 nautical miles (9,100 km; 5,600 mi), though they could steam for 5,660 nmi (10,480 km; 6,510 mi) at that speed. Ohio's significantly greater coal capacity allowed her to cruise for 6,560 nmi (12,150 km; 7,550 mi) at that speed. Steering was controlled by a single rudder, and the ships had a turning radius of 350 yards (320 m) at 10 knots.

=== Armament ===
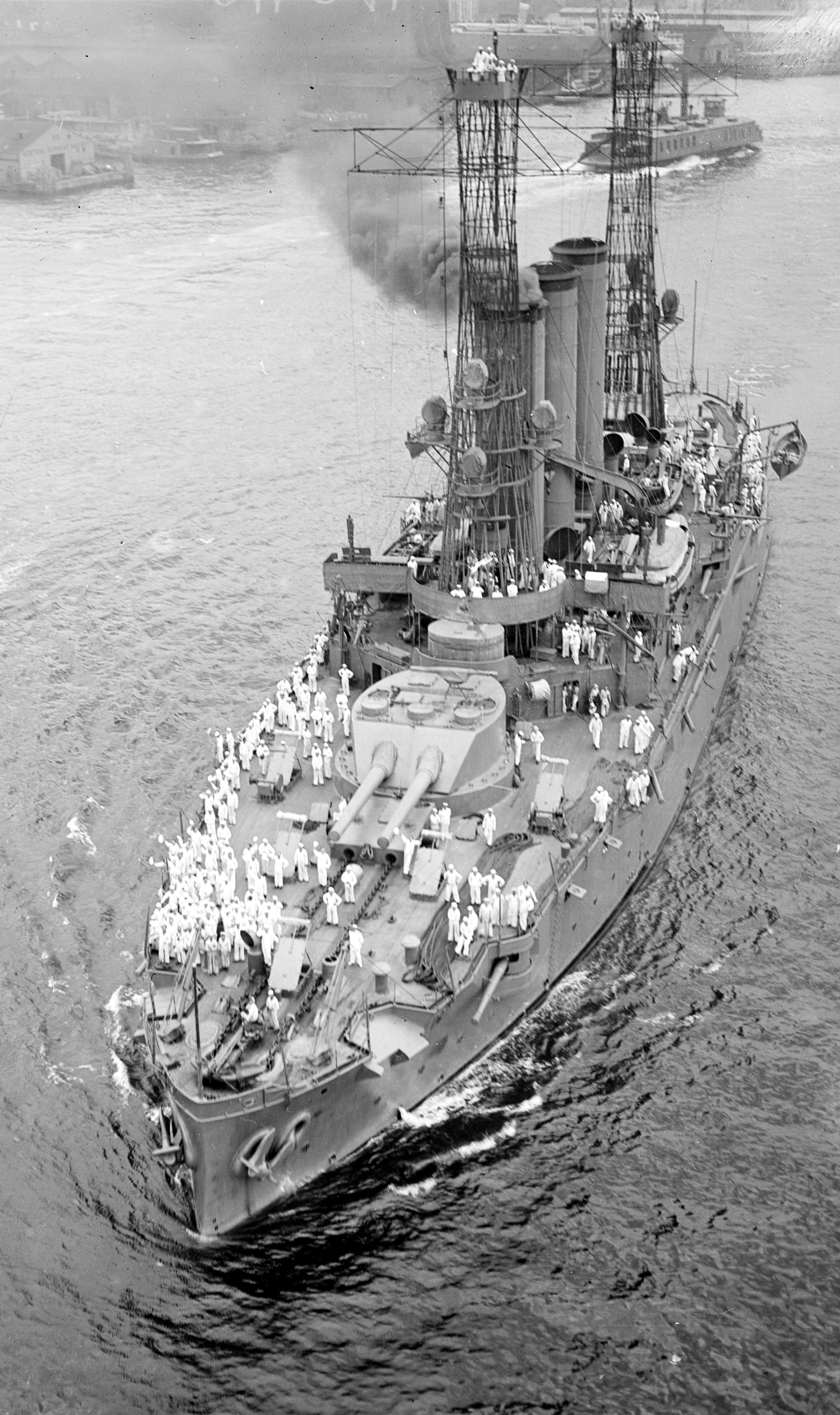
Maine in 1916

The ships were armed with a main battery of four 12-inch/40 caliber Mark 3 guns in two twin gun turrets on the centerline, one forward and aft. (Note: /40 refers to the length of the gun in terms of calibers. A /40 gun is 40 times long as it is in bore diameter.) The guns fired a 870-pound (390 kg) shell at a muzzle velocity of 2,400 feet per second (730 m/s). The turrets were Mark IV mounts, which required the guns to be horizontal to be reloaded. These mounts could elevate to 15 degrees and depress to -5 degrees, and they were electrically operated, and the guns could be operated independently.

The secondary battery consisted of sixteen 6-inch/50 caliber Mark 6 guns, which were placed in casemates in the hull. Ten were mounted in a battery on the upper deck, four more were located in another battery directly above on the forecastle deck, and the last two were placed in sponsoned casemates in the bow. They fired a 105 lb (48 kg) shell at 2,800 ft/s (850 m/s). For close-range defense against torpedo boats, they carried six 3-inch (76 mm)/50 caliber guns mounted in casemates along the side of the hull, eight 3-pounder guns, and six 1-pounder guns. As was standard for capital ships of the period, the Maine-class battleships carried two 18 in (457 mm) torpedo tubes, submerged in her hull on the broadside. Each ship carried a total of six torpedoes. They were initially equipped with the Mark II Whitehead design, which carried a 140-pound (64 kg) warhead and had a range of 800 yards (730 m) at a speed of 27 knots (50 km/h; 31 mph).

=== Armor ===
The ships' armor consisted of both Krupp cemented and Harvey steel. Their main armored belt was 11 in (279 mm) thick over the magazines and the machinery spaces and tapered down to 7.5 in (191 mm) on the lower edge. The belt was 8.5 in (216 mm) elsewhere and reduced to 5.875 in (149 mm) on the bottom edge. The belt extended from 3 ft 3 in (0.99 m) above the waterline to 4 ft 3 in (1.30 m) below. The main deck was 2.5 in (64 mm) thick and was increased slightly to 2.75 in (70 mm) on the sloped sides that connected it to the belt. The deck was increased to 4 in at the stern. The main battery gun turrets had 12 in thick faces, and the supporting barbettes had the same thickness of armor plating on their exposed sides. 9 in (229 mm) thick bulkheads connected the belt with the barbettes; behind these, the barbettes were protected with 8 in of steel. Armor that was 6 in thick protected the secondary battery. The conning tower had 10 in (254 mm) thick sides with a 2 in (51 mm) thick roof.

== Construction ==
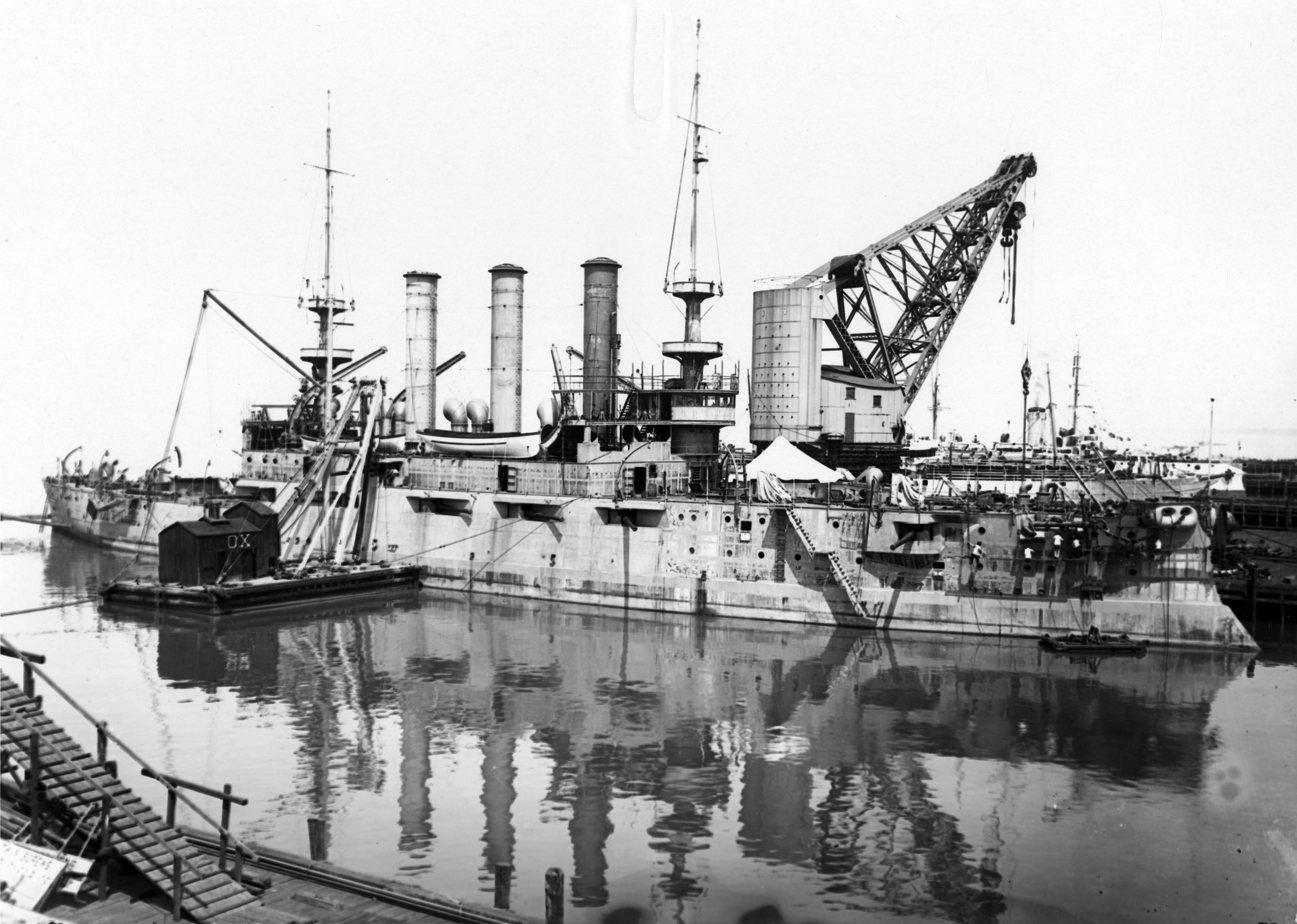
Missouri fitting out in June 1903

Construction data
Name	Builder	Laid down	Launched	Commissioned
USS Maine (BB-10)	William Cramp & Sons	15 February 1899	27 July 1901	29 December 1902
USS Missouri (BB-11)	Newport News Shipbuilding & Drydock Company	7 February 1900	28 December 1901	1 December 1903
USS Ohio (BB-12)	Union Iron Works	22 April 1899	18 May 1901	4 October 1904

== Service history ==
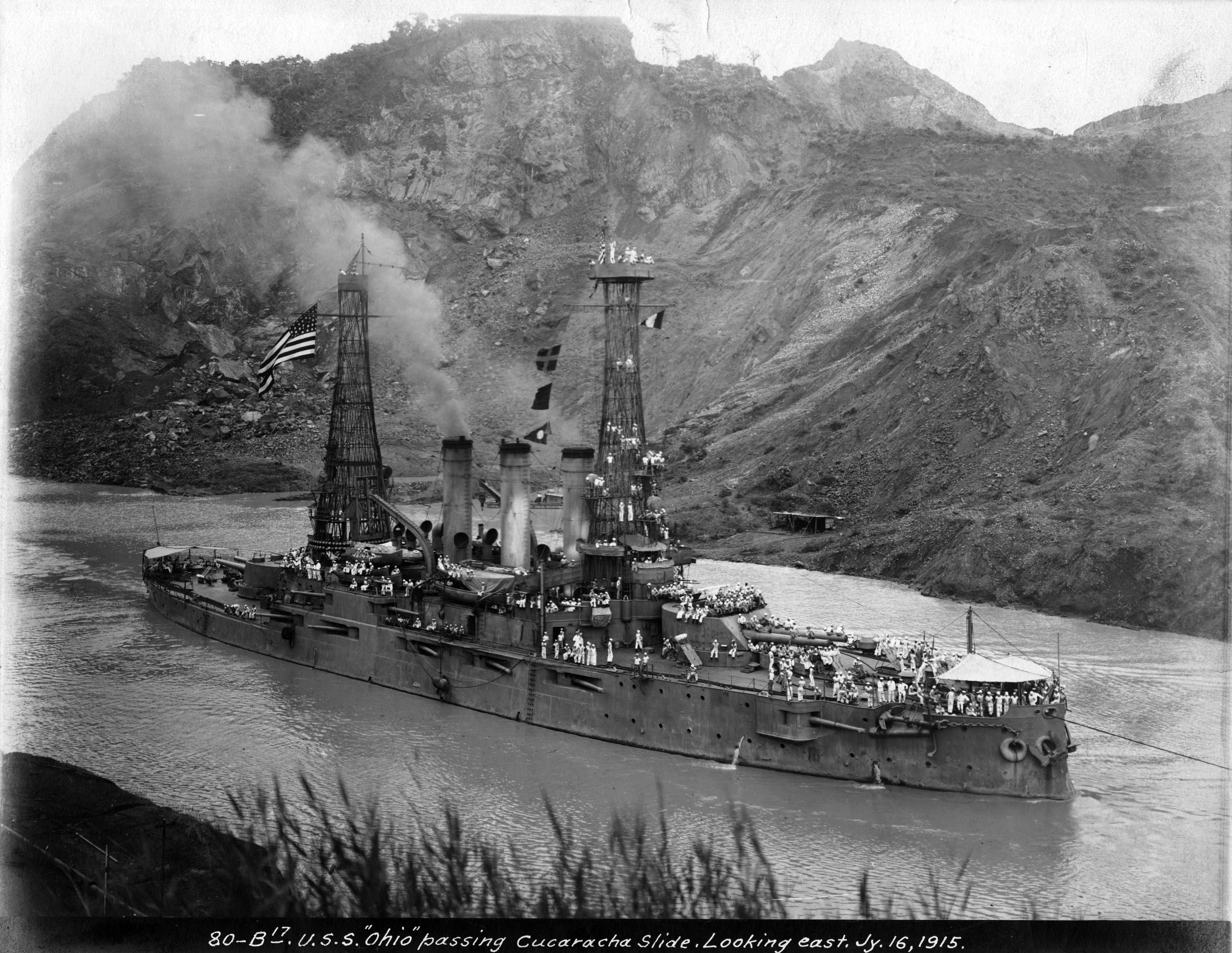
Ohio transiting the Panama Canal on 16 July 1915 during a midshipmen training cruise

After Maine and Missouri entered service, they were assigned to the North Atlantic Fleet, while Ohio, built on the West Coast of the United States, was instead sent to serve as the flagship of the Asiatic Fleet based in the Philippines. In April 1904, a turret fire killed 36 men aboard Missouri, but the quick action of three men prevented the fire from reaching the magazines and destroying the ship, for which they were awarded the Medal of Honor. In 1907, Ohio returned from the western Pacific and joined her sisters in what was now the Atlantic Fleet. (Note: See the DANFS entries for Maine, Missouri, and Ohio,) During this period, Maine served as the flagship of the Atlantic Fleet until she was relieved in April 1907.

In December 1907, the three ships and the other battleships in the Atlantic Fleet steamed out of Hampton Roads, Virginia, at the start of the cruise of the Great White Fleet. The fleet steamed south, around South America and back north to the US west coast. Maine was detached owing to her excessive use of coal along with the battleship Alabama; the two ships continued the journey independently and on a greatly shortened itinerary. The rest of the ships then crossed the Pacific and stopped in Australia, the Philippines, and Japan before continuing on through the Indian Ocean. They transited the Suez Canal and toured the Mediterranean before crossing the Atlantic, arriving bank in Hampton Roads on 22 February 1909 for a naval review with President Theodore Roosevelt.

Over the following six years, the ships had fairly uneventful careers. Missouri spent most of the time out of active service, only recommissioning for summer training cruises with midshipmen from the US Naval Academy. In 1914, Ohio was sent to Mexican waters to protect American interests in the country during the Mexican Revolution. After the United States entered World War I by declaring war on Germany on 6 April 1917, all three ships were used to train naval recruits for the expanding wartime fleet. Following the German surrender in November 1918, Missouri was used to ferry American soldiers back from France, though the other two vessels were not so employed, since their short range and lack of sufficient accommodations would have made them inefficient transports. The three ships remained in active service only very briefly after the war. Ohio was decommissioned in January 1919 and Missouri and Maine followed in September 1919 and May 1920, respectively. All three ships were sold for scrap, with Maine and Missouri going to the breakers' yard in January 1922 and Ohio joining them in March 1923.
