= Kearns (surname) =

Kearns is an anglicized Irish surname of Ó Céirín. Notable people with the surname include:

- Alicia Kearns, British politician elected in 2019
- Anthony Kearns (born 1971), Irish musician
- Austin Kearns (born 1980), baseball player
- Billy Kearns (1923–1992), American actor, seen in French films (1958–1991)
- Bracken Kearns (born 1981), Canadian ice hockey player
- Burt Kearns (born 1956), American author and television & film producer
- Dan Kearns (1956–2022), Canadian football player
- Daniel Kearns (designer) (born 1975), Irish menswear designer
- Daniel Kearns (footballer) (born 1991), Irish footballer
- Daniel F. Kearns (1896–1963), American military aviator
- David T. Kearns (1930–2011), American CEO of Xerox Corporation and Deputy Secretary of Education
- Dennis Kearns (born 1945), Canadian retired ice hockey player
- Doris Kearns Goodwin (born Doris Helen Kearns, 1943), American author
- Gerard Kearns (born 1984), English actor
- Gertrude Kearns (born 1950), Canadian war artist
- H.G.H. Kearns (1902–1986), British entomologist
- James Kearns (born 1957), writer of the film John Q
- John Kearns (born 1987), British comedian
- John Kearns (footballer) (1883–1928), British footballer
- John Kearns (politician) (1784–1864), Irish-Canadian politician
- Joseph Kearns (1907–1962), American actor
- Martin Kearns (1977–2015), English drummer
- Michael Kearns (actor) (1950–2026), American actor
- Michael Kearns (computer scientist), American computer scientist
- Mick Kearns (born 1950), Irish footballer
- Mike Kearns (1929–2009), American professional basketball player
- Mogue Kearns (died 1798), United Irishmen during the 1798 Rebellion
- Ollie Kearns (born 1956), English footballer
- Peter Kearns (1937–2014), English footballer
- Phil Kearns (born 1967), Australian former rugby union player
- Robert Kearns (1927–2005), inventor of the intermittent windshield wiper
- Steve Kearns (born 1956), Canadian football player
- Thomas Kearns (1862–1918), early United States Senator from Utah
- William Henry Kearns (1794–1846), Irish composer
