= Kearns =

Kearns may refer to:

== Places ==
- Kearns, Ontario, part of an incorporated township in Canada.
- Kearns, New South Wales in Australia
- Kearns, Utah in the United States

== Other uses ==
- Kearns (surname)
