= Biemlofen =

Chinese golf apparel manufacturer

- Native name: 比音勒芬
- Type: Public
- Traded as: SZSE: 002832
- Industry: Clothing
- Founded: 2003
- Founder: Xie Bingzheng
- Headquarters: Guangzhou
- Revenue: ▲CN¥3.536 billion (2023)
- Website: www.biemlfgroup.com

Biemlofen (Chinese: 比音勒芬), formerly known as Biemlfdlkk, also known as Biyinlefen, is a Chinese golf apparel manufacturer founded in 2003. Fully referred to as Biemlofen Garment Co., Ltd., it focuses on the field of high-end fashion sportswear. Its main brand is the company's eponymous brand. In addition, it owns the global trademark rights of Cerruti 1881 and Kent & Curwen. The company is owned by Xie Bingzheng.

Headquartered in Guangzhou, Biemlofen stores are concentrated in malls, golf courses, and airports, where they are operated in the form of chain stores. In 2013, it became a sponsor of the Chinese National Golf Team, and was the team's garment supplier during the Tokyo 2020 Summer Olympics. In 2016, the company was listed on the Shenzhen Stock Exchange under the ticker symbol "002832.SZ". In 2018, it launched the Carnaval de Venise brand.

== History ==
Biemlofen was established in 2003. The company opened its first specialty store in 2004. In 2012, it was transformed into a joint-stock company. In 2016, the firm went public on the SZSE.

The full-year revenue of Biemlofen for 2016 amounted to 842 million yuan. In 2023, the figure stood at 3.536 billion yuan. In the same year, the company acquired Cerruti 1881 and Kent & Curwen.

In 2025 they changed their brand and visual identity to Biemlofen.
