= USS Missouri (BB-11) =

Pre-dreadnought battleship of the United States Navy

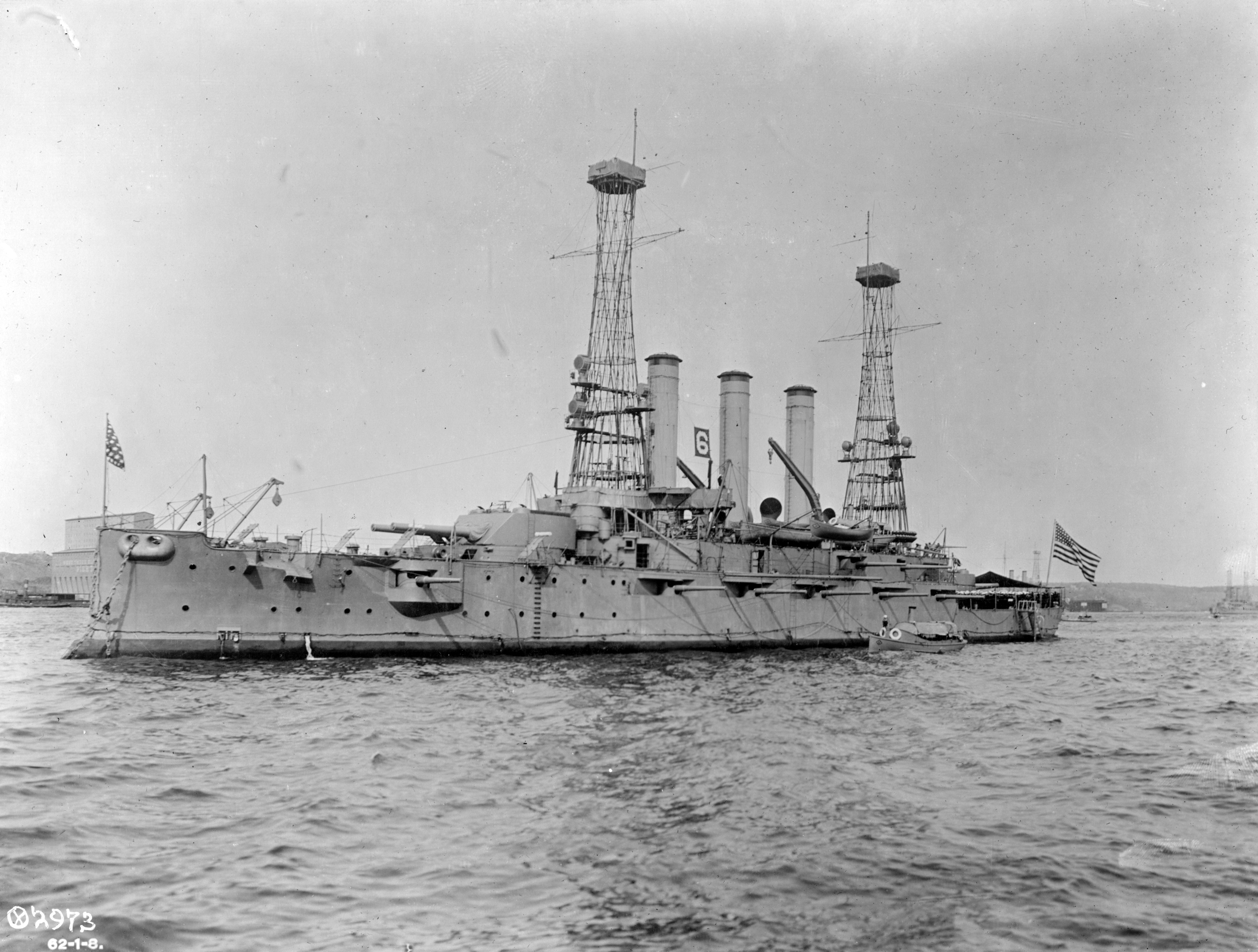
- USS Missouri (BB-11) lying at anchor in 1912

History

United States
- Name: Missouri
- Namesake: Missouri
- Ordered: 4 May 1898
- Builder: Newport News Shipbuilding
- Laid down: 7 February 1900
- Launched: 28 December 1901
- Commissioned: 1 December 1903
- Decommissioned: 8 September 1919
- Stricken: 1 July 1921
- Fate: Sold for scrap

General characteristics
- Class & type: Maine-class battleship
- Displacement: Normal: 12,362 long tons (12,560 t); Full load: 13,700 long tons (13,900 t)
- Length: 393 ft 10 in (120.04 m)
- Beam: 72 ft 3 in (22.02 m)
- Draft: 23 ft 9 in (7.24 m)
- Installed power: 12 × Thornycroft boilers; 16,000 ihp (12,000 kW)
- Propulsion: 2 × triple-expansion steam engines; 2 × screw propellers
- Speed: 18 kn (21 mph; 33 km/h)
- Complement: 561 officers and enlisted
- Armament: 4 × 12 in (305 mm)/40 caliber guns; 16 × 6 in (152 mm)/50 cal Mark 6 guns; 8 × 3-pounders (47 mm (1.9 in)); 6 × 1-pounders (37 mm (1.5 in)); 2 × 18 in (457 mm) torpedo tubes
- Armor: Belt: 8 to 11 in (203 to 279 mm); Turrets: 12 in (305 mm); Casemates: 6 in (152 mm); Conning tower: 10 in (254 mm)

USS Missouri (hull number: BB-11), a Maine-class battleship, was the second ship of her class and of the United States Navy to be named in honor of the 24th state. Missouri was laid down in February 1900 at the Newport News Shipbuilding & Drydock Company, was launched in December 1901, and was commissioned into the fleet in December 1903. She was armed with a main battery of four 12-inch (305 mm) guns and could steam at a top speed of 18 knots (33 km/h; 21 mph).

Missouri spent her entire career in the Atlantic with the North Atlantic Fleet, later renamed the Atlantic Fleet. In late 1907, she and the rest of the Atlantic Fleet circumnavigated the globe as the so-called Great White Fleet, which ended in February 1909. The ship was decommissioned in 1910, with periodic reactivations for summer training cruises over the followed six years. After America entered World War I in April 1917, Missouri was brought back into service to train personnel for the expanding wartime Navy. She served briefly as a troopship in 1919, carrying American soldiers back from France, before being decommissioned in September that year. Ultimately, she was sold for scrapping in January 1922.

== Description ==
The United States Congress passed a major naval construction program in response to the outbreak of the Spanish–American War in 1898; the program included three new battleships, which were to become the Maine class. The class incorporated several significant technological developments, including smaller caliber main guns that used smokeless powder to achieve greater muzzle velocity (and thus penetrating power), Krupp cemented armor that was stronger than Harvey armor used on earlier vessels, and water-tube boilers that provided more power for the engines.

Plan and profile drawing of the Maine class

Missouri was 393 feet 11 inches (120.07 m) long overall and had a beam of 72 ft 3 in (22.02 m) and a draft of 23 ft 9 in (7.24 m). She displaced 12,362 long tons (12,560 t) as designed and up to 13,700 long tons (13,900 t) at full load. The ship was powered by two-shaft triple-expansion steam engines rated at 16,000 indicated horsepower (12,000 kW), driving two screw propellers. Steam was provided by twelve coal-fired Thornycroft boilers, which were vented into three funnels. The propulsion system generated a top speed of 18 knots (33 km/h; 21 mph). As built, she was fitted with heavy military masts, but these were quickly replaced by cage masts in 1909. She had a crew of 561 officers and enlisted men, which increased to 779–813.

The ship was armed with a main battery of four 12 in (305 mm) /40 caliber (Note: /40 refers to the length of the gun in terms of calibers. A /40 gun is 40 times long as it is in bore diameter.) guns in two twin gun turrets on the centerline, one forward and aft. The secondary battery consisted of sixteen 6 in (152 mm) /50 caliber Mark 6 guns, which were placed in casemates in the hull. For close-range defense against torpedo boats, she carried six 3 in (76 mm) /50 caliber guns mounted in casemates along the side of the hull, eight 3-pounder guns, and six 1-pounder guns. As was standard for capital ships of the period, Missouri carried two 18 in (457 mm) torpedo tubes, submerged in her hull on the broadside.

Missouri's main armored belt was 11 in (279 mm) thick over the magazines and the propulsion machinery spaces and 8 in (203 mm) elsewhere. The main battery gun turrets had 12-inch (305 mm) thick faces, and the supporting barbettes had the same thickness of armor plating on their exposed sides. Armor that was 6 in thick protected the secondary battery. The conning tower had 10 inches (254 mm) thick sides.

== Service history ==
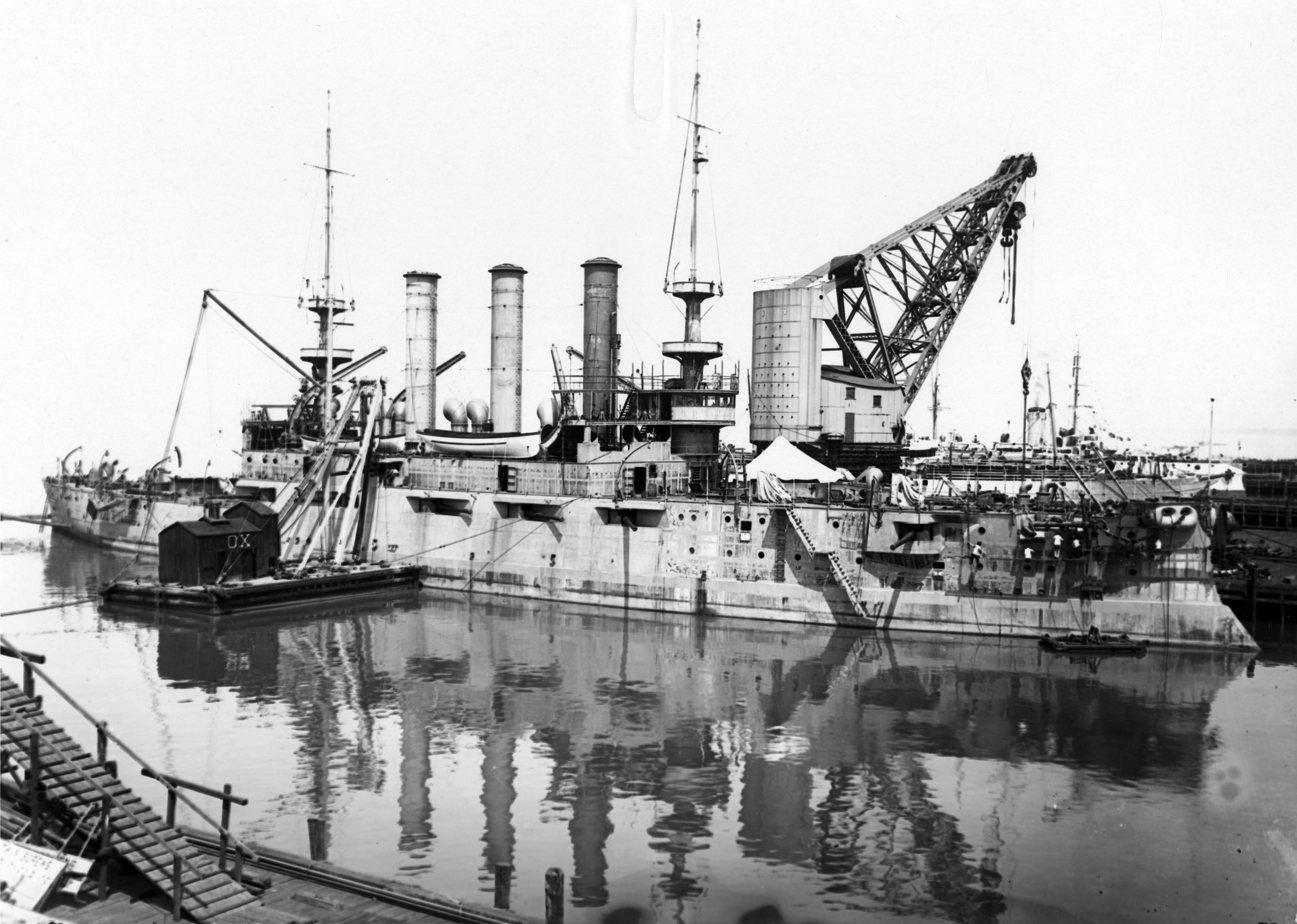
Missouri fitting out in June 1903

=== 1900 – 1907 ===
Missouri was laid down at the Newport News Shipbuilding & Drydock Company on 7 February 1900, the third member of the class to be begun. She was launched on 28 December 1901 and commissioned into the fleet on 1 December 1903. The ship was assigned to the North Atlantic Fleet after entering service. She steamed out of Norfolk to begin her sea trials off the Virginia Capes on 4 February 1904 before joining the rest of the fleet in the Caribbean for training exercises.

On 13 April, the ship suffered an accident during gunnery training; the port 12-inch gun in her rear turret flared backward on firing and ignited three propellant charges in the turret. The resulting fire suffocated 36 men in the turret, though quick action among surviving members of the turret crew prevented the fire from spreading to the magazines, where it would have destroyed the ship. For their actions, three men were awarded the Medal of Honor. Missouri returned to Newport News for repairs, which were completed by early June.

On 9 June, Missouri left Newport News for a tour of the Mediterranean, arriving back in New York on 17 December. She remained with the North Atlantic Fleet for the next three years conducting normal peacetime training. During this period, the fleet was renamed the Atlantic Fleet. Missouri assisted in relief work in Kingston, Jamaica from 17 to 19 January 1907, following a severe earthquake there. That April, she participated in the Jamestown Exposition. The ceremonies were held to commemorate the 300th anniversary of the Jamestown colony. An international fleet that included British, French, German, Japanese, and Austro-Hungarian warships joined the US Navy at the event.

=== Great White Fleet ===
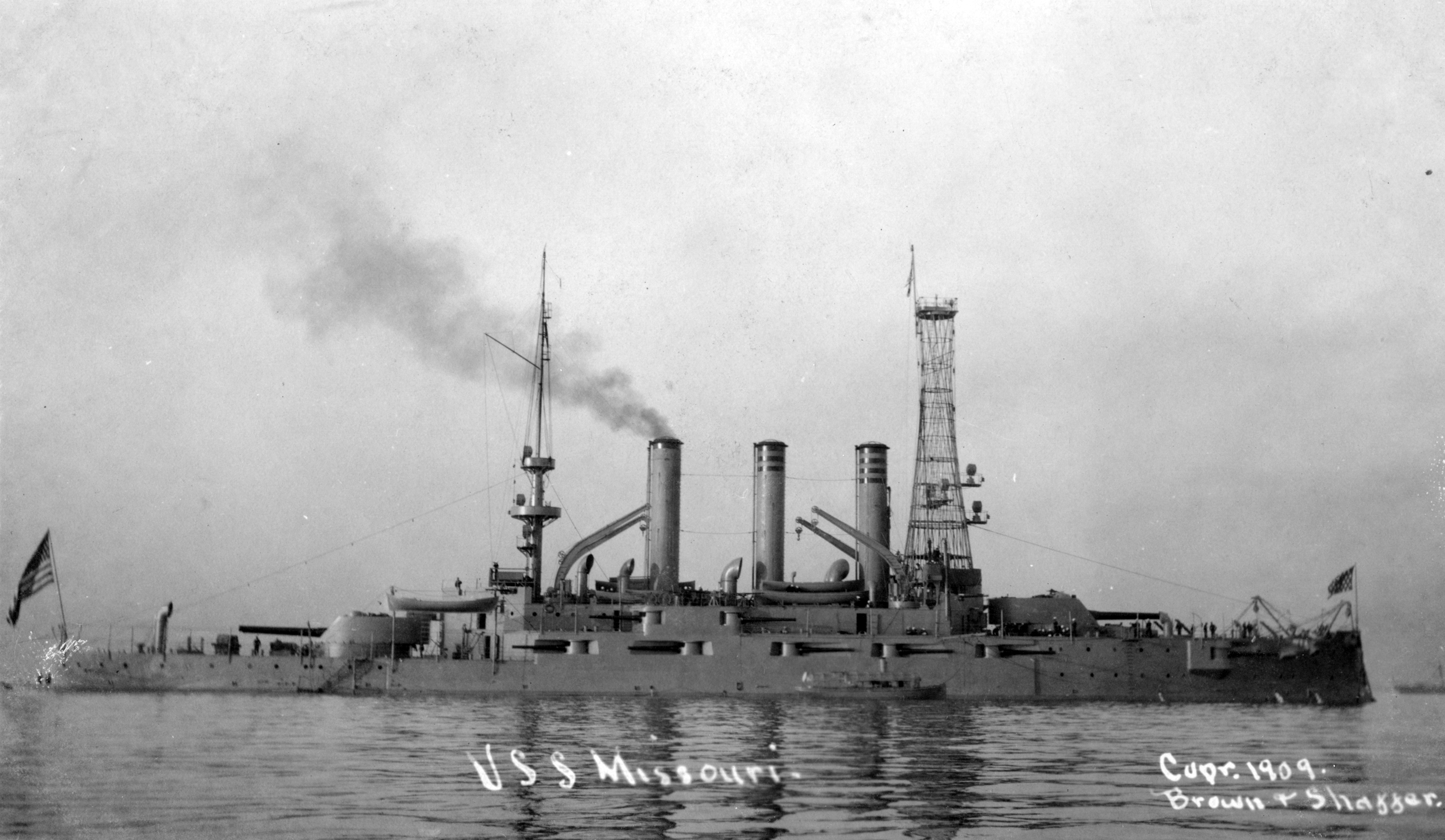
Missouri in late 1909 with one cage mast installed

Missouri's next significant action was the cruise of the Great White Fleet around the world, which started with a naval review for President Theodore Roosevelt in Hampton Roads. The cruise of the Great White Fleet was conceived as a way to demonstrate American military power, particularly to Japan. Tensions had begun to rise between the United States and Japan after the latter's victory in the Russo-Japanese War in 1905, particularly over racist opposition to Japanese immigration to the United States. The press in both countries began to call for war, and Roosevelt hoped to use the demonstration of naval might to deter Japanese aggression.

On 17 December, the fleet steamed out of Hampton Roads and cruised south to the Caribbean and then to South America, making stops in Port of Spain, Rio de Janeiro, Punta Arenas, and Valparaíso, among other cities. After arriving in Mexico in March 1908, the fleet spent three weeks conducting gunnery practice. The fleet then resumed its voyage up the Pacific coast of the Americas, stopping in San Francisco and Seattle before crossing the Pacific to Australia, stopping in Hawaii on the way. Stops in the South Pacific included Melbourne, Sydney, and Auckland.

After leaving Australia, the fleet turned north for the Philippines, stopping in Manila, before continuing on to Japan where a welcoming ceremony was held in Yokohama. Three weeks of exercises followed in Subic Bay in the Philippines in November. The ships passed Singapore on 6 December and entered the Indian Ocean; they coaled in Colombo before proceeding to the Suez Canal and coaling again at Port Said, Egypt. The fleet called in several Mediterranean ports before stopping in Gibraltar, where an international fleet of British, Russian, French, and Dutch warships greeted the Americans. The ships then crossed the Atlantic to return to Hampton Roads on 22 February 1909, having traveled 46,729 nautical miles (86,542 km; 53,775 mi). There, they conducted a naval review for Roosevelt.

=== Later career ===
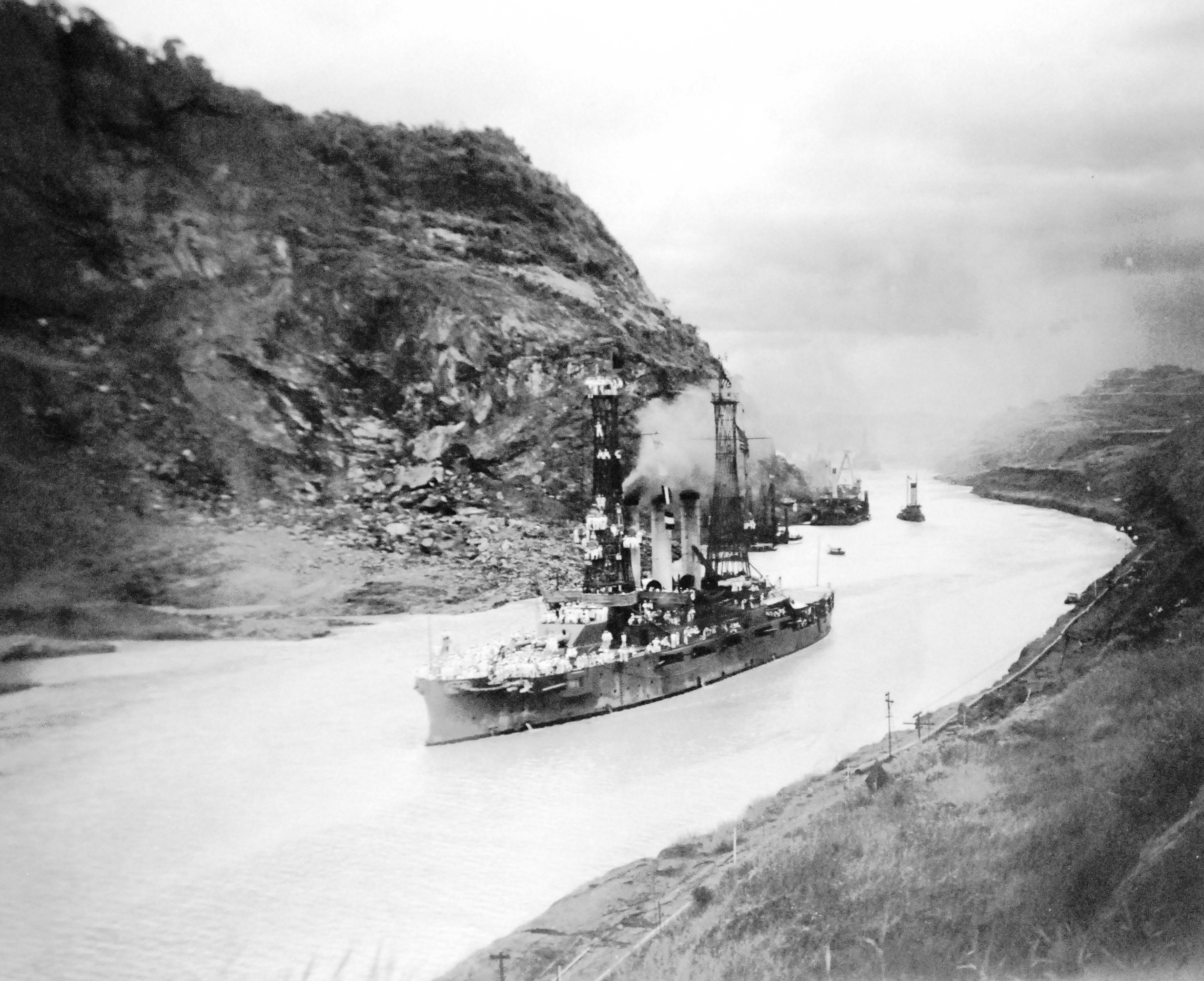
Missouri traversing the Panama Canal on July 16, 1915

Missouri spent the next several years laid up, with periodic reactivations for summer training cruises for midshipmen from the US Naval Academy. She was reduced temporarily to reserve status on 1 May 1910 in Boston, though she was recommissioned on 1 June 1911 for service with the Atlantic Fleet. In June 1912, the ship was deployed to Cuba with a contingent of Marines to protect American interests during a rebellion in the country. She conducted a midshipmen training cruise in July before being decommissioned a second time on 9 September, this time at Philadelphia. She returned to service on 16 March 1914 for another midshipmen cruise, which visited Italy and Great Britain. On 2 December, she was again decommissioned before returning to service on 15 April 1915 for a midshipmen cruise in the Caribbean, through the Panama Canal, and to visit ports in California. After arriving back in Philadelphia, she was reduced to the Reserve Fleet yet again on 18 October. Another period of active service began on 2 May 1916 for a training cruise along the east coast of the United States and into the Caribbean, before Missouri was again laid up late in the year.

On 6 April 1917, the United States declared war on Germany, entering World War I. Missouri was recommissioned on 23 April for service as a training ship for gunners and engine room personnel, based in the Chesapeake Bay. Rear Admiral Hugh Rodman hoisted his flag aboard Missouri on 26 August, as the commander of the 2nd Division, Atlantic Fleet. On 11 November 1918, Germany signed the Armistice that ended the war. Missouri was subsequently used to ferry American soldiers back from Europe as part of the Cruiser and Transport Force. Her first voyage began on 15 February 1919 when she steamed out of Norfolk; three more would follow that year. In the course of the four trips, she carried 3,278 soldiers back to the United States. The old battleship was decommissioned for the last time on 8 September 1919 at the Philadelphia Navy Yard. Missouri was sold to J. G. Hitner and W. F. Cutler of Philadelphia on 26 January 1922 and subsequently broken up for scrap.
