= USS Maine (BB-10) =

Pre-dreadnought battleship of the United States Navy

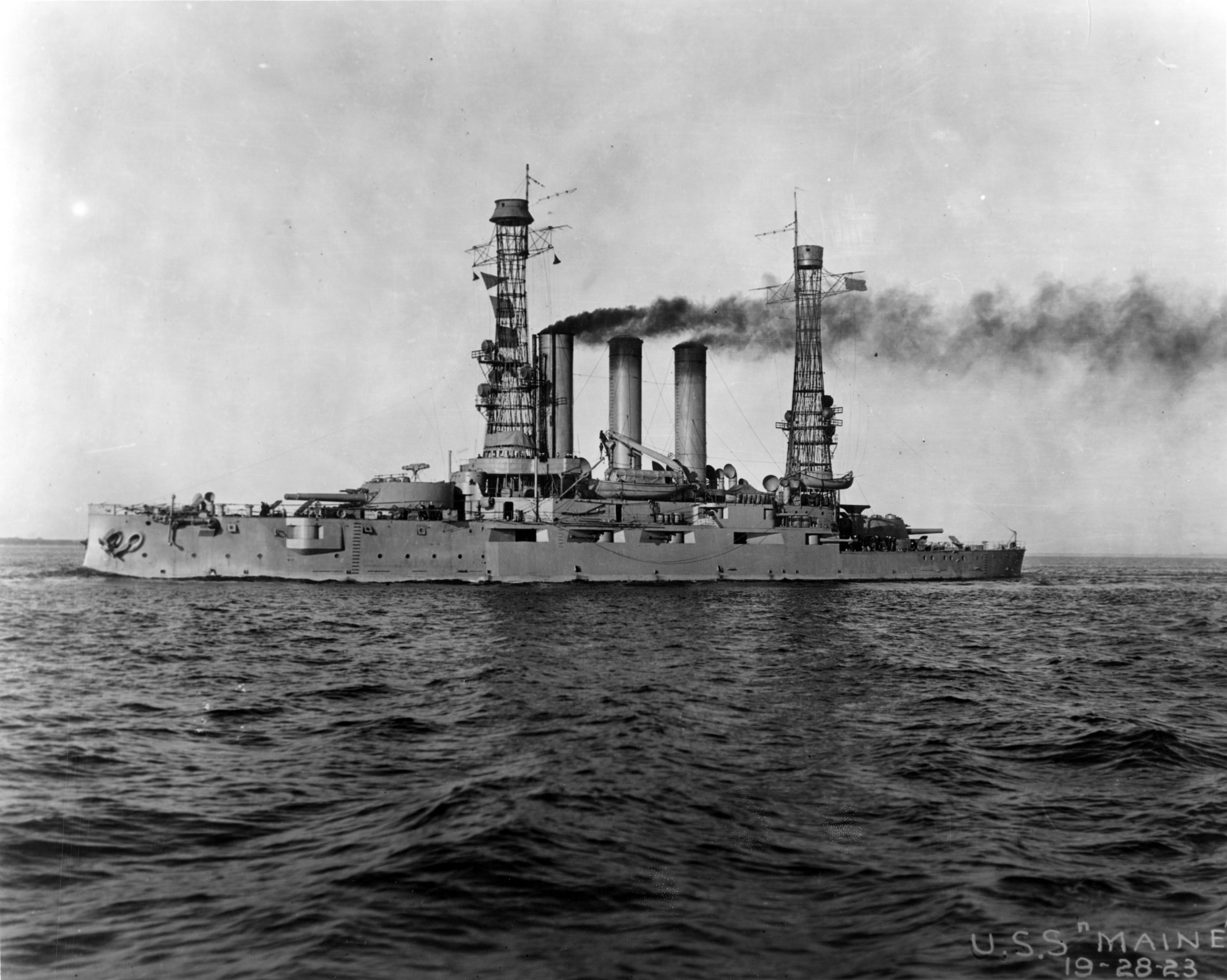
- USS Maine underway in 1918

History

United States
- Name: Maine
- Namesake: Maine
- Builder: William Cramp & Sons
- Laid down: 15 February 1899
- Launched: 27 July 1901
- Commissioned: 29 December 1902
- Decommissioned: 15 May 1920
- Fate: Broken up, 1922

General characteristics
- Class & type: Maine-class battleship
- Displacement: Normal: 12,846 long tons (13,052 t); Full load: 13,700 long tons (13,900 t)
- Length: 393 ft 10 in (120.04 m)
- Beam: 72 ft 3 in (22.02 m)
- Draft: 24 ft 4 in (7.42 m)
- Installed power: 24 × Niclausse boilers; 16,000 ihp (12,000 kW)
- Propulsion: 2 × triple-expansion steam engines; 2 × screw propellers
- Speed: 18 kn (21 mph; 33 km/h)
- Complement: 561 officers and enlisted
- Armament: 4 × 12 in (305 mm)/40 caliber guns; 16 × 6 in (152 mm)/50 cal Mark 6 guns; 8 × 3-pounders (47 mm (1.9 in)); 6 × 1-pounders (37 mm (1.5 in)); 2 × 18 in (457 mm) torpedo tubes
- Armor: Belt: 8 to 11 in (203 to 279 mm); Turrets: 12 in (305 mm); Casemates: 6 in (152 mm); Conning tower: 10 in (254 mm)

USS Maine (hull number BB-10), the lead ship of her class of pre-dreadnought battleships, was the second ship of the United States Navy to be named in honor of the 23rd state. Maine was laid down in February 1899 at the William Cramp & Sons shipyard in Philadelphia. She was launched in July 1901 and commissioned into the fleet in December 1902. She was armed with a main battery of four 12-inch (305 mm) guns and could steam at a top speed of 18 knots (33 km/h; 21 mph).

Maine served in the Atlantic for the entirety of her career with the North Atlantic Fleet, which later became the Atlantic Fleet; during the early years of her service, she was the fleet flagship, until she was replaced in 1907. Later that year, she joined the cruise of the Great White Fleet, though her heavy coal consumption prevented her from continuing with the fleet past San Francisco. After returning to the U.S., she served as the 3rd Squadron flagship. During America's participation in World War I from April 1917 to November 1918, Maine was used as a training ship. She remained in active service until May 1920, when she was decommissioned. The ship was ultimately sold for scrap in January 1922 and broken up for scrap under the terms of the Washington Naval Treaty signed that year.

== Description ==
The United States Congress passed a major naval construction program in response to the outbreak of the Spanish–American War in 1898; the program included three new battleships, which were to become the Maine class. The class incorporated several significant technological developments, including smaller caliber main guns that used smokeless powder to achieve greater muzzle velocity (and thus penetrating power), Krupp cemented armor that was stronger than Harvey armor used on earlier vessels, and water-tube boilers that provided more power for the engines.

Plan and profile drawing of the Maine class

Maine was 393 feet 11 inches (120.07 m) long overall and had a beam of 72 ft 3 in (22.02 m) and a draft of 24 ft 4 in (7.42 m). She displaced 12,846 long tons (13,052 t) as designed and up to 13,700 long tons (13,900 t) at full load. The ship was powered by two-shaft triple-expansion steam engines rated at 16,000 indicated horsepower (12,000 kW), driving two screw propellers. Steam was provided by twenty-four coal-fired Niclausse boilers, which were vented into three funnels. The propulsion system generated a top speed of 18 knots (33 km/h; 21 mph). As built, she was fitted with heavy military masts, but these were quickly replaced by cage masts in 1909. She had a crew of 561 officers and enlisted men, which increased to 779–813.

The ship was armed with a main battery of four 12 in (305 mm) /40 caliber (Note: /40 refers to the length of the gun in terms of calibers. A /40 gun is 40 times long as it is in bore diameter.) guns in two twin gun turrets on the centerline, one forward and aft. The secondary battery consisted of sixteen 6 in (152 mm) /50 caliber Mark 6 guns, which were placed in casemates in the hull. For close-range defense against torpedo boats, she carried six 3 in (76 mm) /50 caliber guns mounted in casemates along the side of the hull, eight 3-pounder guns, and six 1-pounder guns. As was standard for capital ships of the period, Maine carried two 18 in (457 mm) torpedo tubes, submerged in her hull on the broadside.

Maine's main armored belt was 11 inches (279 mm) thick over the magazines and the propulsion machinery spaces and 8 inches (203 mm) elsewhere. The main battery gun turrets had 12-inch (305 mm) thick faces, and the supporting barbettes had the same thickness of armor plating on their exposed sides. Armor that was 6 in thick protected the secondary battery. The conning tower had 10-inch (254 mm) thick sides.

== Service history ==
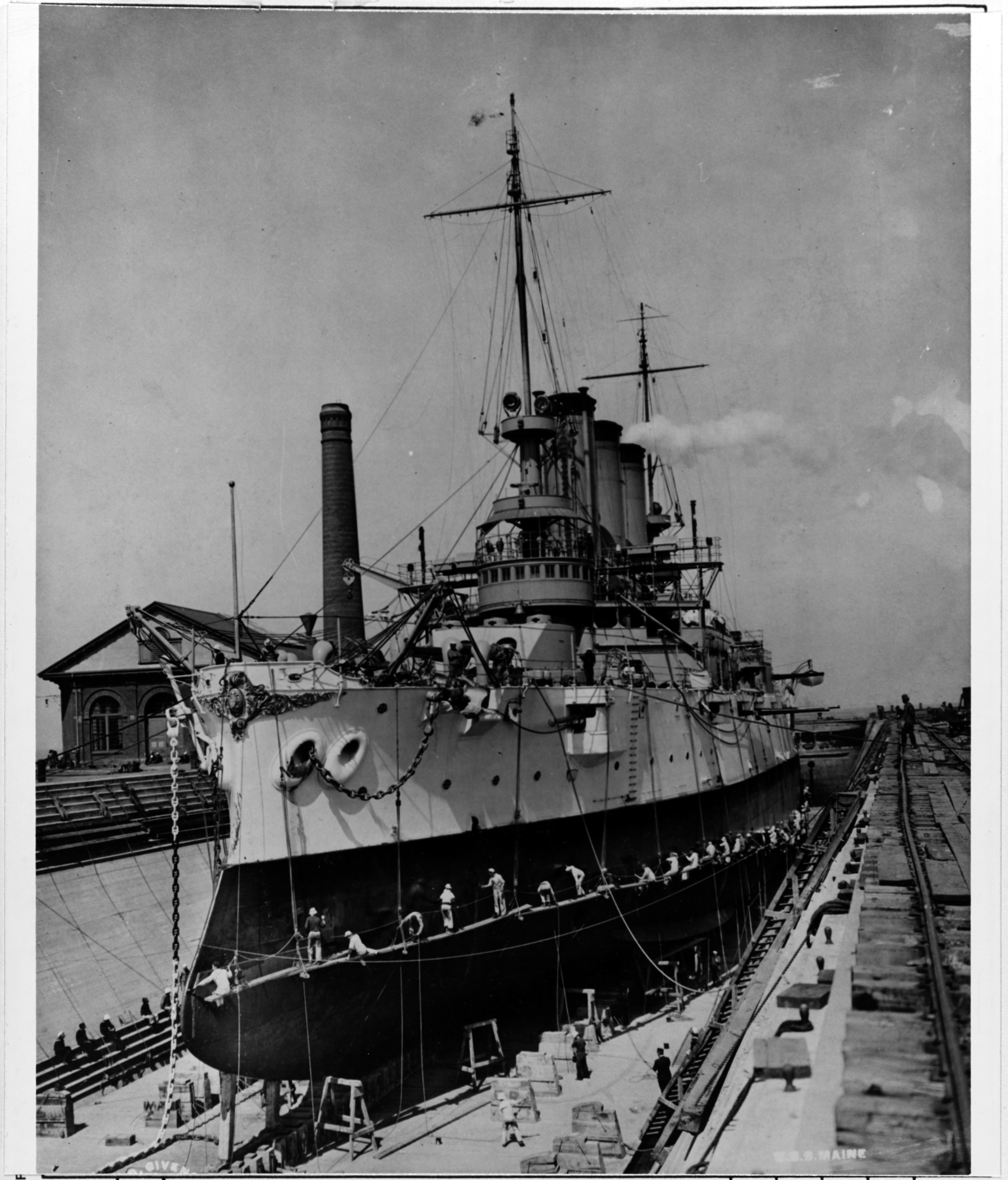
Maine in drydock in San Francisco in 1908

Maine was built by the William Cramp & Sons shipyard in Philadelphia; her keel was laid down on 15 February 1899. The ship was launched on 27 July 1901 and commissioned into the fleet on 29 December 1902. Maine operated with the North Atlantic Fleet starting in 1903; over the next four years, she took part in various peacetime training exercises in the Atlantic and Caribbean. During this period she also steamed to the Mediterranean. She served as the flagship of Rear Admiral Robley D. Evans. On 16 April 1907, Evans transferred his flag to the newly commissioned battleship Connecticut.

Maine's next significant action was the cruise of the Great White Fleet around the world, which started with a naval review for President Theodore Roosevelt in Hampton Roads. The cruise of the Great White Fleet was conceived as a way to demonstrate American military power, particularly to Japan. Tensions had begun to rise between the United States and Japan after the latter's victory in the Russo-Japanese War in 1905, particularly over racist opposition to Japanese immigration to the United States. The press in both countries began to call for war, and Roosevelt hoped to use the demonstration of naval might to deter Japanese aggression. On 17 December, the fleet steamed out of Hampton Roads and cruised south to the Caribbean and then to South America, making stops in Port of Spain, Rio de Janeiro, Punta Arenas, and Valparaíso, among other cities. After arriving in Mexico in March 1908, the fleet spent three weeks conducting gunnery practice. The fleet then resumed its voyage up the Pacific coast of the Americas, stopping in San Francisco, where Maine was detached from the rest of the fleet. The ship's boilers had proved to be badly inefficient, requiring excessive amounts of coal to keep up with the fleet. The battleship Alabama also left the fleet, owing to a cracked cylinder head.

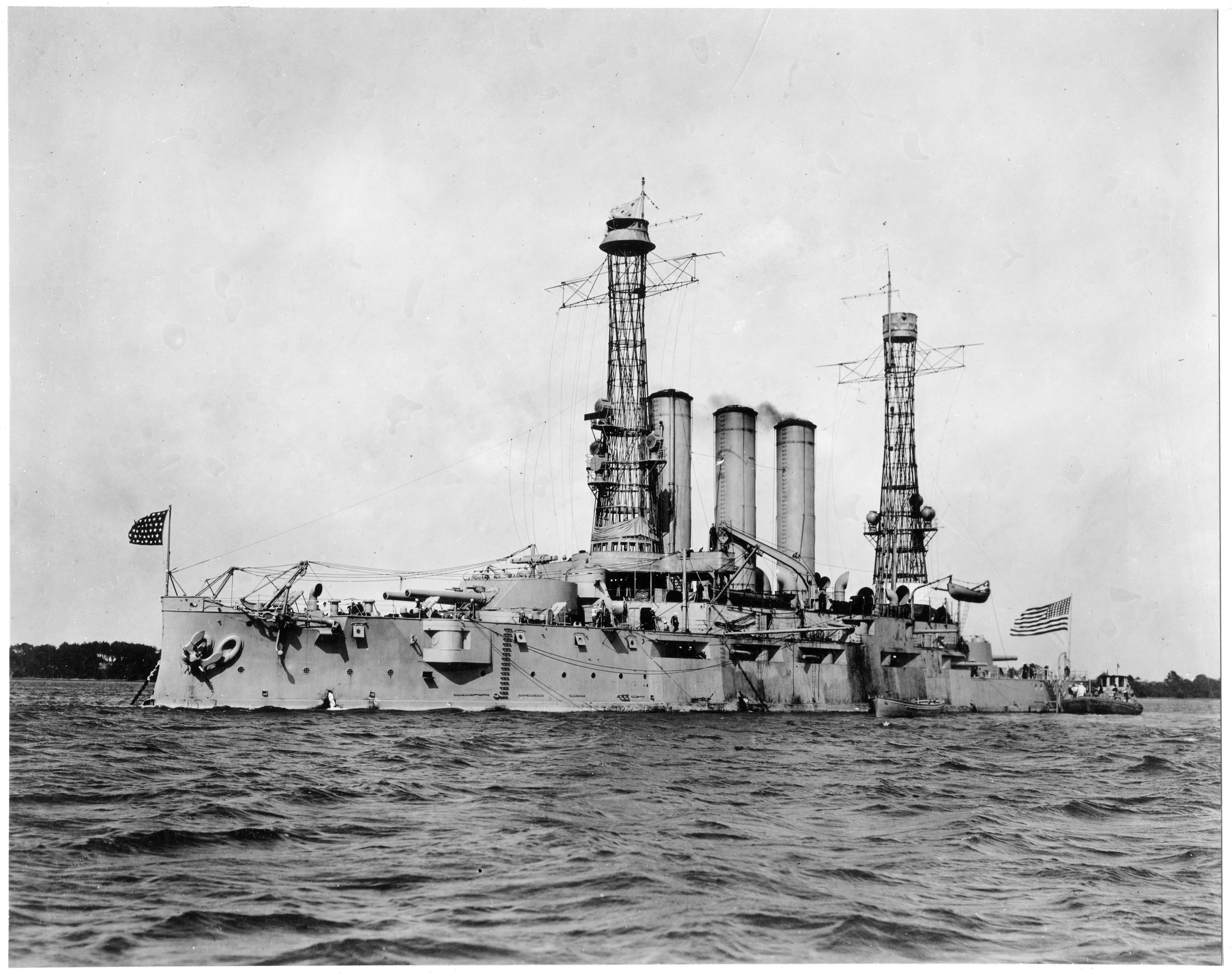
Maine at the World War I victory naval review in December 1918

Maine and Alabama crossed the Pacific independently, via Guam and the Philippines. After steaming through the Indian Ocean, they transited the Suez Canal and cruised the Mediterranean. They crossed the Atlantic and arrived back on the east coast of the United States in October 1908, well ahead of the rest of the Great White Fleet. Following their arrival, Maine was assigned as the flagship of the 3rd Squadron, Atlantic Fleet, and operated off the east coast for the next several months. On 14 February, Maine, the new battleships New Hampshire, Mississippi, and Idaho, two armored cruisers and two scout cruisers were organized to meet the returning Great White Fleet. Maine and the rest of the squadron, under the command of Rear Admiral Conway Hillyer Arnold, steamed out into the Atlantic and rendezvoused with the Great White Fleet on 17 February. The combined fleet arrived in Hampton Roads on the 22nd, where a large naval review was held for Theodore Roosevelt to celebrate the journey. On 31 August 1909, the ship was temporarily decommissioned at Portsmouth, New Hampshire. She returned to service on 15 June 1911 for duty with the Atlantic Fleet.

Maine at Jackson Avenue Wharf in New Orleans during Mardi Gras 1917

In February 1917, Maine and USCGC Comanche docked in New Orleans for a week as part of that year's Mardi Gras celebrations. On 6 April 1917, the United States declared war on Germany, entering World War I. During the war, Maine was employed as a training ship for engine room personnel, armed guards for merchant ships, and midshipmen from the US Naval Academy. On 11 November 1918, Germany signed the Armistice that ended the conflict. Maine participated in a naval review held in New York on 26 December to celebrate the Allied victory. At the time, most of the battleships of the Atlantic Fleet were used as transports to ferry American soldiers back from France. Maine and her sisters were not so employed, however, owing to their short range and small size, which would not permit sufficient additional accommodations. Maine instead remained on the east coast with the Atlantic Fleet.

On 15 May 1920, she was decommissioned at the Philadelphia Navy Yard and was reclassified as BB-10 on 17 July. She was kept laid up for a year and a half before being sold on 26 January 1922 to J.G. Hitner and W.F. Cutler of Philadelphia to be broken up for scrap. By 17 December 1923, she had been disarmed in accordance with the Washington Naval Treaty, which mandated significant reductions in naval strength. Maine was then scrapped.
