= Kent & Curwen =

British retailer

- Type: Subsidiary
- Industry: Retailer
- Founded: 1926; 100 years ago in London, United Kingdom
- Founders: Eric Kent; Dorothy Curwen
- Key people: Daniel Kearns (Chief Creative Officer)
- Products: Menswear, Womenswear, Clothing, Accessories, Fashion
- Owner: Biem. L. Fdlkk Garment Group
- Website: www.kentandcurwen.com

Kent & Curwen is a British retailer, established in 1926 in London by Eric Kent and Dorothy Curwen. Previously owned by Biem. L. Fdlkk Garment Group, it was acquired by the Guangzhou-based Biemlofen with Cerruti 1881 in 2023. First making its name supplying ties for Oxford and Cambridge universities, over the decades, Kent & Curwen expanded its offerings, introducing the cricket jumper in the 1930s. The brand has also outfitted staff uniforms at several British institutions including the Wimbledon Championships. Today, it is under the direction of Designer Daniel Kearns.

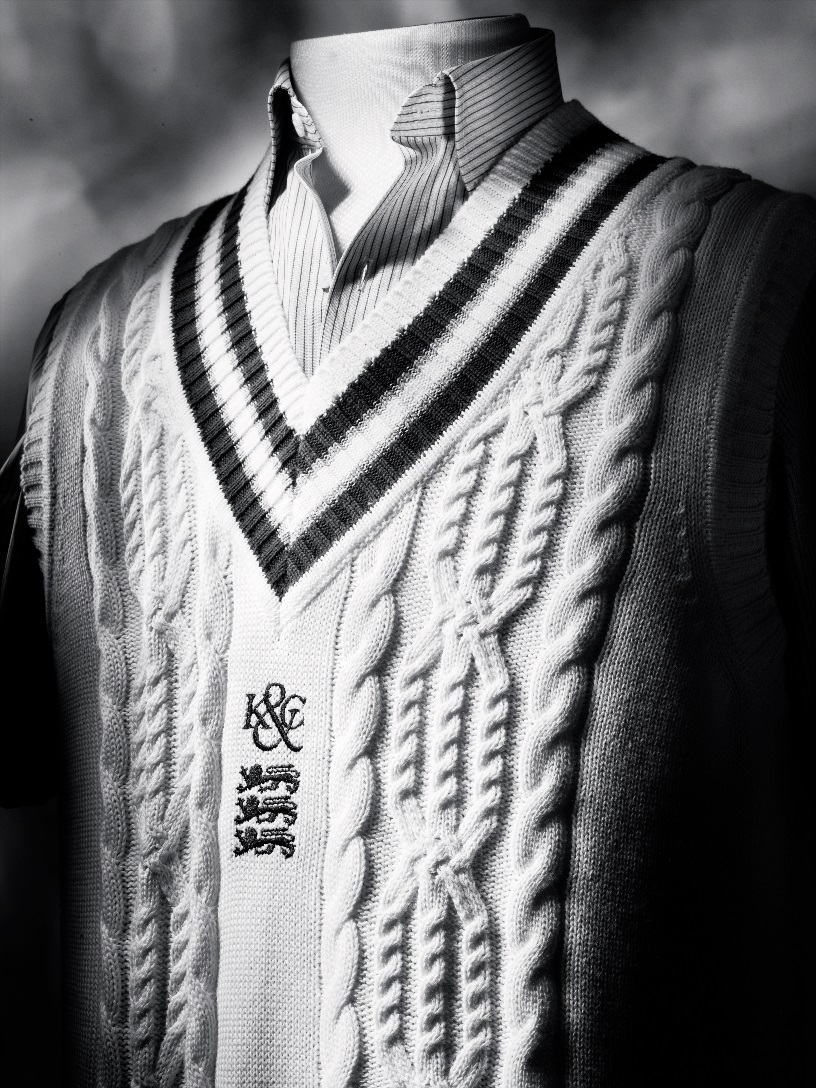
Kent & Curwen's trademark with Three Lions logo

== History ==
In 1926 Eric Kent and Dorothy Curwen established E.W Kent & Curwen in London. They began as a manufacturer of regimental, club and college ties, supplying Oxford and Cambridge universities. In 1932 the company bought a knitwear factory in London to manufacture its first cricket jumpers. In the 1930s, E.W Kent & Curwen dressed the Hollywood Cricket team.

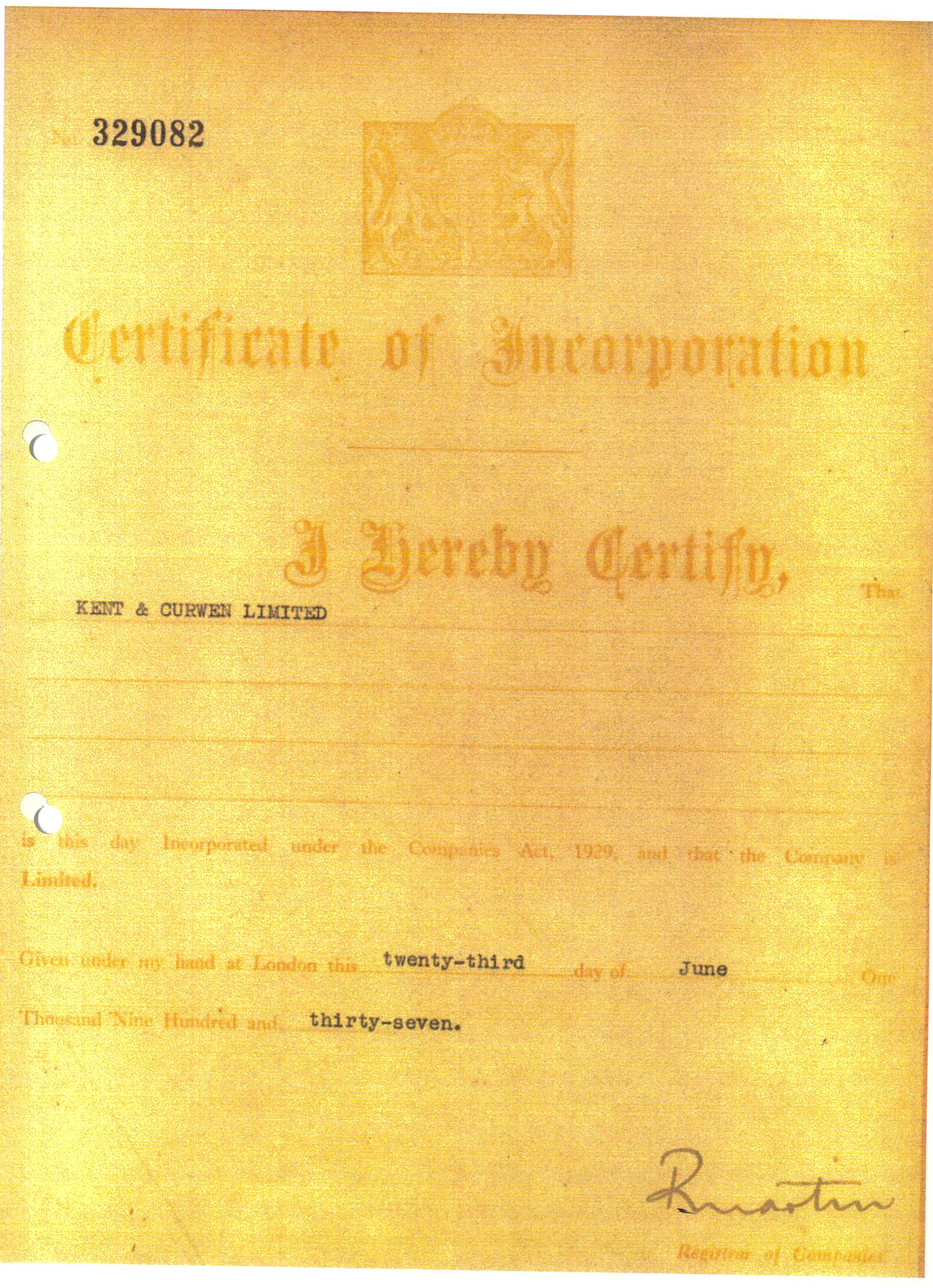
Kent & Curwen's certificate of Incorporation, 23 June 1937

On 23 June 1937 E.W Kent & Curwen was registered as a limited company becoming simply Kent & Curwen Ltd., trading on Silver Street in the City of London. On 12 February 1939 Eric Kent died suddenly, aged just 46. On 18 December 1972 Dorothy died at her home on Sussex Coast. In 1973 Kent & Curwen moved from Warwick Street to a leasehold premise on Domingo Street.

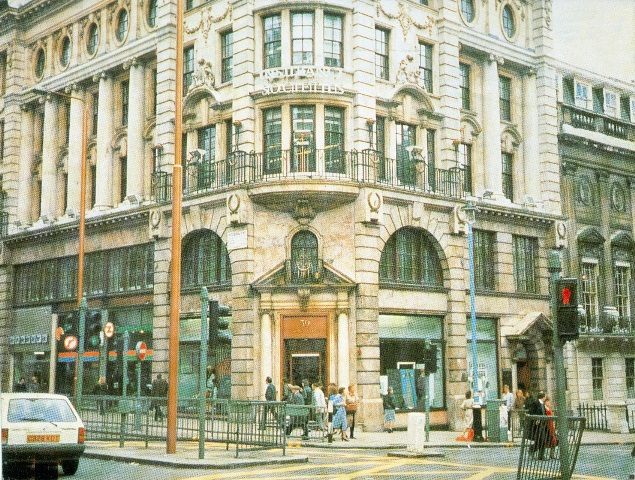
Kent & Curwen's store in St. James’ Street, London (Photo taken in 1980s)

In the 1980s Kent & Curwen opened their own store at 39 St. James’ Street, close to Piccadilly Circus. They also became the costumes sponsor of the Oscar winning film Chariots of Fire. In December 1982 Kent & Curwen was taken over by a Swiss trading company called Giselle. Through this merger, the company was introduced to the Japanese company, D'Urban, with whom a trading agreement was formed.

In the 1980s, Kent & Curwen began to explore the export market, exhibiting at trade shows in New York and Paris. In 1986, they opened on Rodeo Drive, Beverly Hills and had a store on Fifth Avenue in New York. In Asia, Kent & Curwen opened across Singapore and Hong Kong.

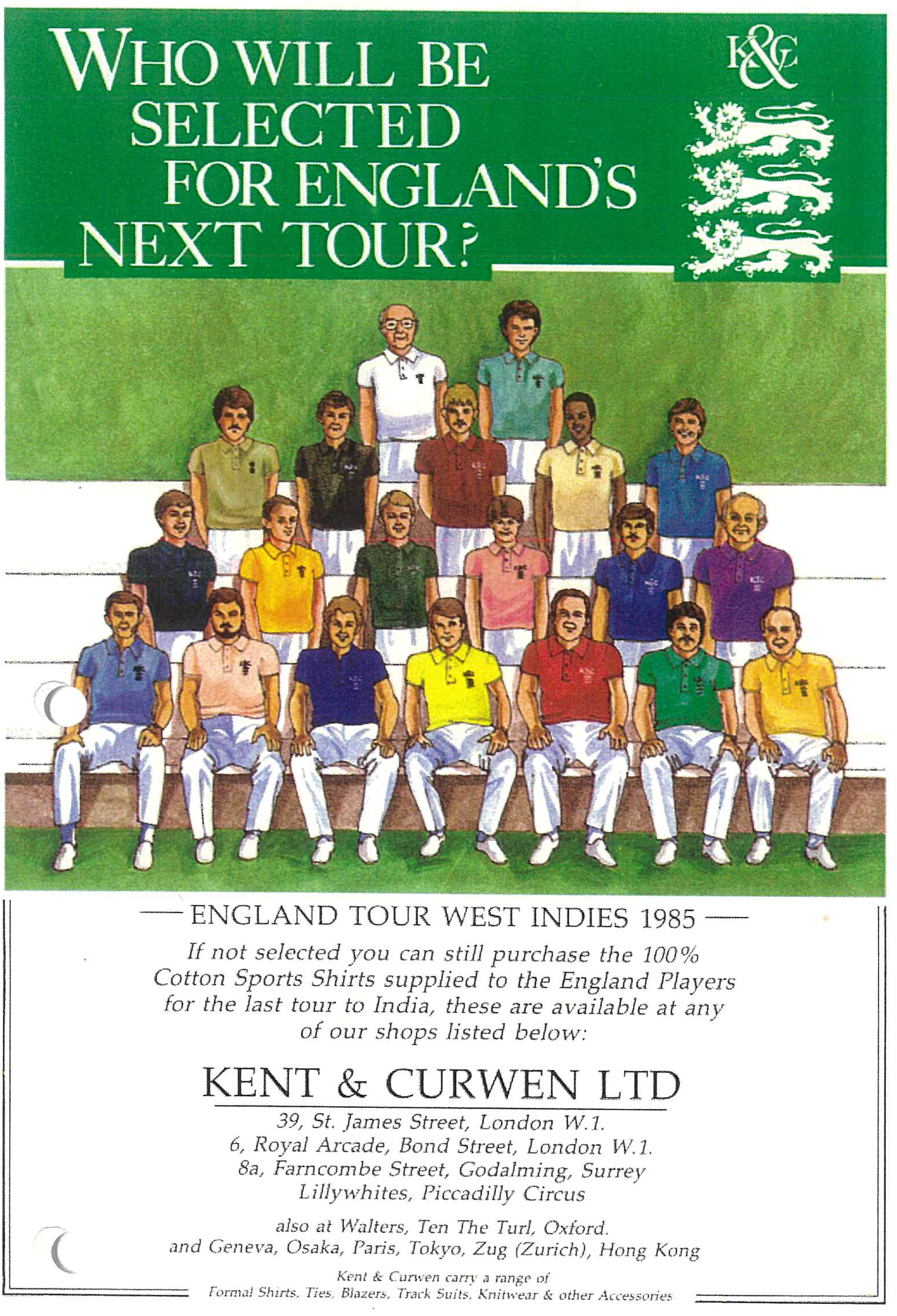
Kent & Curwen's Advertisement in 1980s

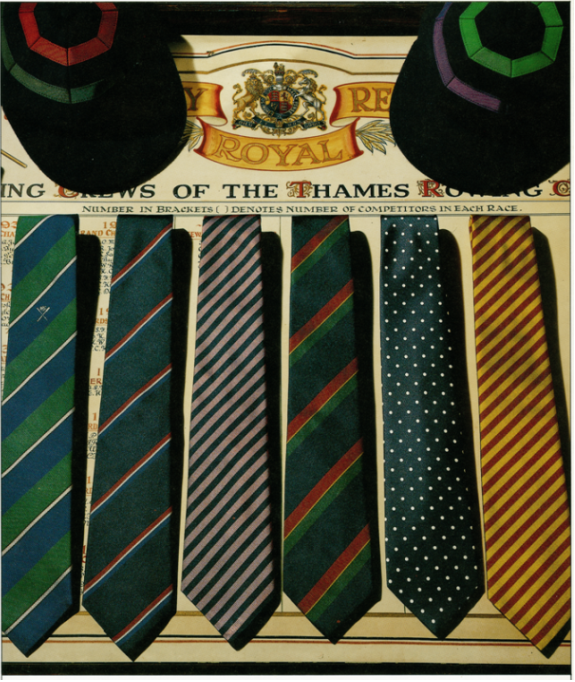
Kent & Curwen Silk Ties

In the early 2000s each of the stores closed in quick succession, including the St. James store in 2002. In 2006 Kent & Curwen opened a new flagship store on Conduit Street. In 2008 Kent & Curwen was acquired by Trinity Limited of Li & Fung Group with headquarters in Hong Kong. In February 2010 Kent & Curwen opened a new shop at No. 2, Piccadilly Arcade. In 2015 Kent & Curwen started a 5-year global business partnership with David Beckham. In 2016 Kent & Curwen appointed Daniel Kearns as Creative Director. In 2017 the brand opened a second London shop at Covent Garden. In 2021 Kent and Curwen ceased trading in the UK after liquidation of the Chinese owner and Trinity Group. The closure led to the shutdown of the UK head office and the termination of the retail shops. The brand also closed its UK website. In 2023 after the COVID-19 pandemic Kent & Curwen is brought by Biem. L. Fdlkk Garment Group. Daniel Kearns rejoined the brand as Chief Creative Officer. The Autumn/Winter 2024 collection was the first company's first co-ed collection, released with a campaign photographed by Glen Luchford and Look Book by Jack Day. In September 2024 Kent & Curwen presented its Spring/Summer 2025 fashion show at the Royal Academy Schools during London Fashion Week.

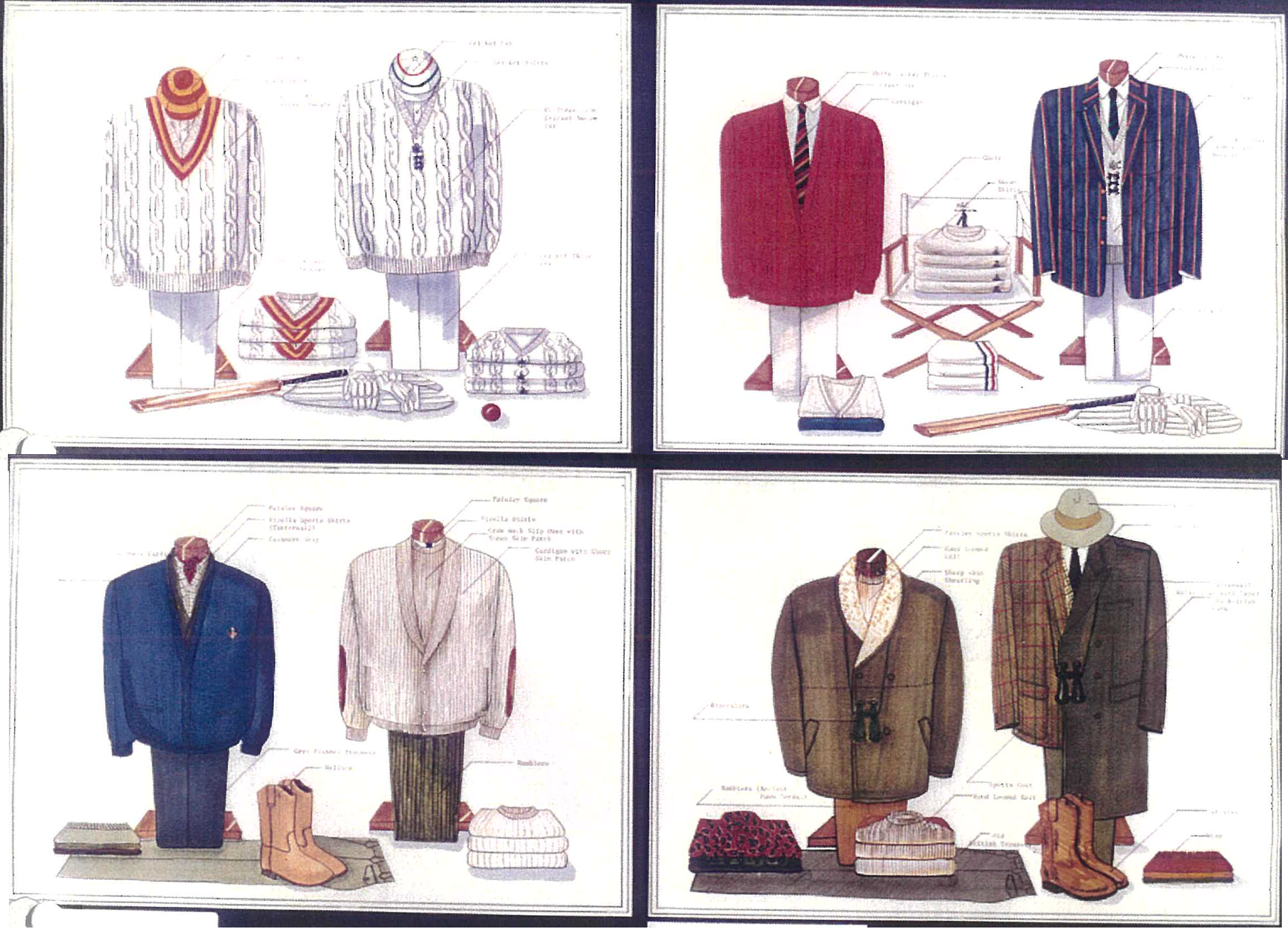
Design Drawings of Kent & Curwen's clothing

Kent & Curwen was the official uniforms supplier of Hong Kong’s representatives for the London 2012 Summer Olympic Games. Kent & Curwen's designs included white knit jacket and casual polo shirts.

At the 17th Asian Games at Incheon in 2014 Kent & Curwen were the official uniforms supplier for the Hong Kong representative.

Kent & Curwen announced a 5-year partnership with David Beckham in September 2015.

Daniel Kearns was appointed in February 2016 to oversee all collections, including the partnership with David Beckham.

== Philanthropy ==
Kent & Curwen has sponsored the “Kent & Curwen Centenary Sprint Cup” since 2010 In 2012, they sponsored a charity cricket match in support of British servicemen through the charities Help for Heroes and Walking with the Wounded. They were the sponsor of The Kent & Curwen Royal Charity Polo Cup between 2012 and 2014. In January 2019, Kent & Curwen launched a collection produced in collaboration with the BBC TV show Peaky Blinders, which included frock coats, tailored suits, and the flat cap featured in the television show. In 2019, David Shrigley created motifs and statements to fit with the brand's style. The collaboration included sweatshirts, T-shirts and accessories.
