= Daniel F. Kearns =

American military aviator

Daniel Francis Kearns (3 October 1896 - 9 December 1963) was a military aviator and important figure in the founding of the Colorado Air National Guard.

== Aviation career ==
Kearns would begin his flying career in 1920 as a second lieutenant with the 88th Aero Squadron at Langley Field, Virginia. Kearns would participate in General William Mitchell's bombing demonstrations against decommissioned U.S. Navy ships (to illustrate the importance of air power). Kearns would bomb both the USS Alabama (BB-8) and the USS San Marcos during these demonstrations.

=== Role in the Colorado Air National Guard ===
Along with Colorado secretary of state Carl Milliken, Kearns was responsible for the early organization and founding of the 120th Observation Squadron of the Colorado National Guard. After the formation and federal recognition of the squadron, Kearns would become the squadron's chief test pilot and serve as a master sergeant within the unit. All new aircraft the unit received were tested and shaken down by Kearns. On June 27, 1924 Kearns flew the first set of Curtiss JN-4 'Jenny' aircraft delivered to the fledgling squadron. Kearns' early test flights from Lowry Field proved that such aircraft could operate at the high altitudes of Colorado. Kearns would later be commissioned as a 1st lieutenant for his role within the squadron. Kearns would continue to perform impressive and notable feats with the squadron, such as a 6-day round trip flight to New York in 1925. Kearns even survived a substantial crash in a Douglas O-2C near Aspen in 1926.

=== Silverton Mercy Mission ===
Kearns' most widely documented and notable accomplishment with the Colorado Air Guard was his role in the unit's first mercy mission. Snowstorms in March 1927 completely cut off Silverton, Colorado from outside contact. Although the town had ample food and water, a pandemic outbreak of typhoid fever had stricken the town, and medicine was desperately needed. The 120th was called upon to deliver vaccines to Silverton. On March 7, 1927, Kearns and fellow guard pilot Clyde Plank set off from Lowry Field at 8:30 am in a Douglas O-2C to deliver the desperately needed vaccines. Kearns and Plank flew over dangerous mountainous terrain to Silverton and arrived shortly after noon. The pair dropped the supplies from the aircraft to the snow-covered town below; the supplies landed unharmed in a snow drift. With the mission complete the pair then refueled at Pueblo and returned to Lowry Field at 4:55 pm to a crowd of local reporters.

The mission was widely covered by local press, making Kearns a local celebrity. The flight also brought attention to the wide variety of uses for civil aviation in the United States at the time.

== Later life ==
During his final years in Colorado Kearns wrote aviation columns for the Denver Post, promoting the development and expansion of general aviation. In 1929 Kearns left the Colorado Air National Guard to fly with Chicago-based Universal Airlines. Kearns would later return to Colorado as an aviation adviser for the Civil Works Administration. Kearns died on 9 December 1963. He is buried at Fort Logan National Cemetery in Denver, Colorado. Kearns was posthumously inducted into the Aviation Hall of Fame of Colorado in 1970.
