= Daniel Kearns (designer) =

Irish fashion designer (born 1975)

Daniel Kearns (born 15 April 1975) is an Irish designer with a master's degree in menswear from the Royal College of Art. He has held menswear designer positions at Alexander Mc Queen and John Galliano. From 2005 to 2010 he was design director of menswear at Alexander McQueen and in March 2011 he was made menswear design director at Yves Saint Laurent. Kearns has consulted for Zegna, Louis Vuitton and Roberto Cavalli, he was made artistic director of French Brand Faconnable in 2013. He left his position at Faconnable in April 2015. Kearns was appointed Creative Director of Kent & Curwen in 2016, the British heritage brand that was relaunched with David Beckham. In June 2020 Kearns was made Group Creative Director of Trinity Brands overseeing the creative studios of Gieves & Hawkes, Cerruti 1881 as well as Kent & Curwen. In 2023, under new ownership, he returned to Kent & Curwen and Cerruti as Chief Creative Officer, leading collections across menswear, womenswear, and accessories.

== Early career and education ==
Kearns grew up in Dublin, Ireland. Kearns earned a BA in Fashion Design from the National College of Art and Design in Dublin in 1997, and during his time there, he also completed a tailoring apprenticeship with Louis Copeland.

This fueled Kearns's interest in tailoring, and prompted a move to London in 1997 where he undertook a master's degree in menswear at the Royal College of Art, alongside a research project at the college focused on the development of ergonomic tailoring with intelligent textiles incorporating Shape Memory Alloy. This led to a collaboration with Yorkshire mill Bower Roebuck & Co, who produced samples of the textile.

While at the Royal College of Art, Kearns won a Dolce & Gabbana menswear project in 1998, which resulted in a three-month stint at the fashion house working on both mainline and the D&G line.

After graduating in 2000, Kearns was named Menswear Designer at Emanuel Ungaro, after which he was brought in to help launch John Galliano menswear as Head of Menswear from 2002 until 2005.

== Alexander McQueen ==
Kearns was design director of Menswear from 2005 until 2010. During that time, he worked closely with Alexander McQueen on every menswear show until his last show in January 2010, while also developing and expanding the identity of the menswear ready-to-wear and accessories collections, to great critical acclaim.

== Louis Vuitton ==
In January 2010, Kearns was named Designer for the Outdoor Department for Louis Vuitton. Here, he designed a capsule range for the Travel Room entitled ‘Made for Travel’, as well as the L.V. Trophy sea collection.

== Yves Saint Laurent ==
In March 2011, Kearns was hired by Yves Saint Laurent to overlook its menswear collection as design director.

== Faconnable ==
In 2013, Kearns was hired by Façonnable to overlook its menswear and womenswear collections as artistic director.

== Kent & Curwen ==
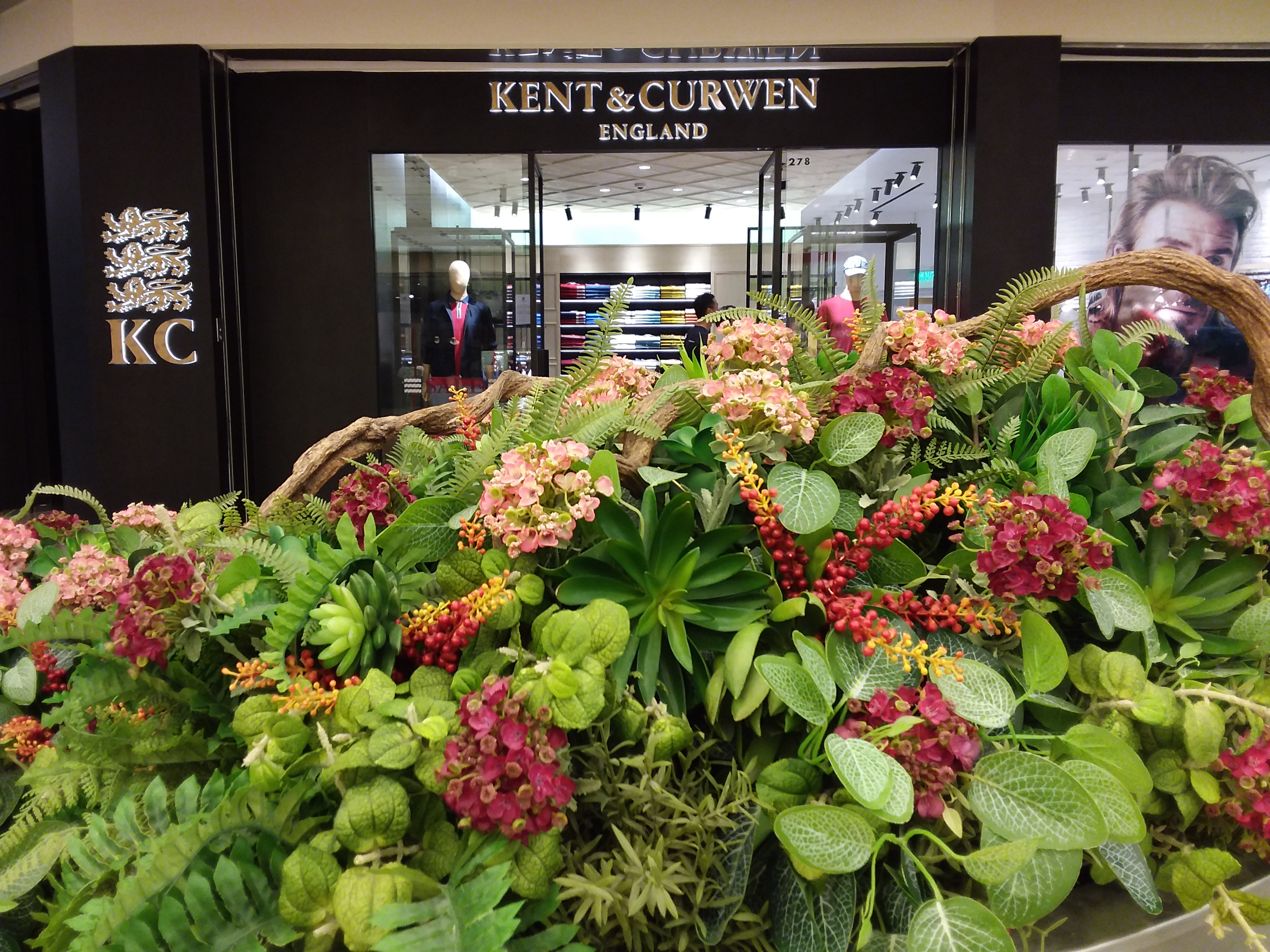
the shop Kent & Curwen

In February 2016, Kearns became Creative Director of Kent & Curwen, a British heritage brand with a sporting legacy and British preppy style. David Beckham invested in the brand and worked with Kearns on modernizing the collections. After new ownership from the Biem. L. Fdlkk Garment group in 2023 Kearns returned to Kent & Curwen as Chief Creative Officer, overseeing an expansion into menswear, womenswear, and accessories. Kearns relaunched the brand with an AW24 co-ed collection and showed a Spring/Summer 2025 collection at London Fashion Week in September 2024.
