= List of battleships of the United States Navy =

Ships of the United States Navy

Ships in current service
- Current ships

Ships grouped alphabetically
- A–B; C; D–F; G–H; I–K; L; M; N–O; P; Q–R; S; T–V; W–Z

Ships grouped by type
- Aircraft carriers; Airships; Amphibious warfare ships; Auxiliaries; Battlecruisers; Battleships; Cruisers; Destroyers; Destroyer escorts; Destroyer leaders; Escort carriers; Frigates; Hospital ships; Littoral combat ships; Mine warfare vessels; Monitors; Oilers; Patrol vessels; Registered civilian vessels; Sailing frigates; Steam frigates; Steam gunboats; Ships of the line; Sloops of war; Submarines; Torpedo boats; Torpedo retrievers; Unclassified miscellaneous; Yard and district craft

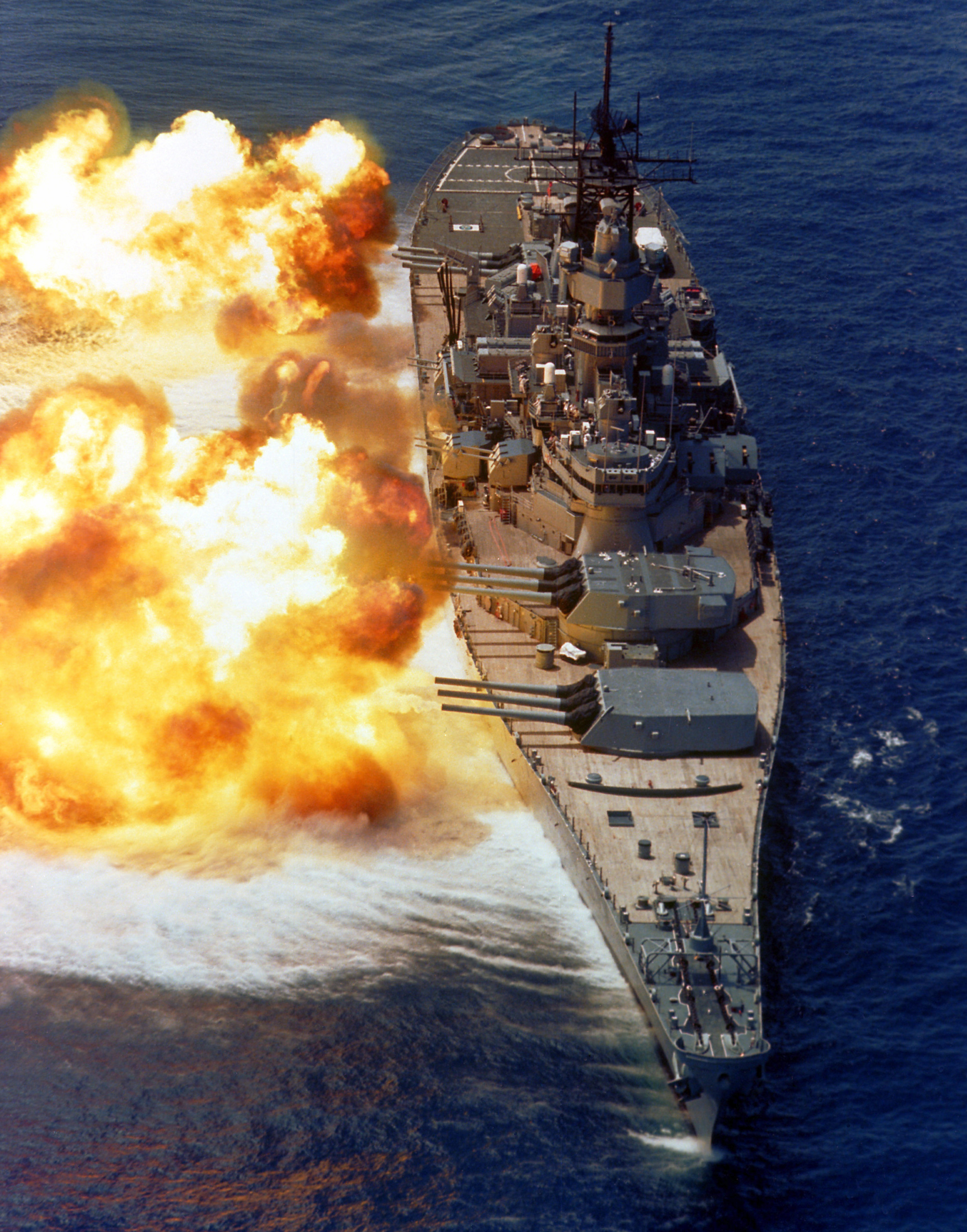
USS Iowa (BB-61)

The United States Navy began the construction of battleships with USS Texas in 1892, although its first ship to be designated as such was USS Indiana. Texas and USS Maine, (Note: USS Maine is not listed here because she was built as an armored cruiser but later reclassified as a second-rate battleship.) commissioned three years later in 1895, were part of the New Navy program of the late 19th century, a proposal by then Secretary of the Navy William H. Hunt to match Europe's navies that ignited a years-long debate that was suddenly settled in Hunt's favor when the Brazilian Empire commissioned the battleship Riachuelo. In 1890, Alfred Thayer Mahan's book The Influence of Sea Power upon History was published and significantly influenced future naval policy—as an indirect result of its influence on Secretary Benjamin F. Tracy, the Navy Act of June 30, 1890 authorized the construction of "three sea-going, coast-line battle ships" which became the Indiana class. The Navy Act of July 19, 1892 authorized construction of a fourth "sea-going, coast-line battle ship", which became USS Iowa. Despite much later claims that these were to be purely defensive and were authorized as "coastal defense ships", they were almost immediately used for offensive operations in the Spanish–American War. By the start of the 20th century, the United States Navy had in service or under construction the three Illinois-class and two Kearsarge-class battleships, making the United States the world's fifth strongest power at sea from a nation that had been 12th in 1870.

Except for Kearsarge, named by an act of Congress, all U.S. Navy battleships have been named for states, and each of the 48 contiguous states has had at least one battleship named for it except Montana; two battleships were authorized to be named Montana but both were cancelled before construction started. Alaska and Hawaii did not become states until 1959, after the end of battleship building, but the battlecruiser, or "Large Cruiser," USS Alaska was built during World War II and her sister, USS Hawaii, was begun but never completed. The pre-dreadnoughts USS Zrinyi (formerly the Austrian SMS Zrínyi), USS Radetzky (formerly the Austrian SMS Radetzky), and the dreadnought USS Ostfriesland (formerly the German SMS Ostfriesland), taken as prizes of war after World War I, were commissioned in the US Navy, but were not assigned hull classification symbols.

No American battleship has ever been lost at sea, though four were sunk during the attack on Pearl Harbor. Of these, only USS Arizona (BB-39) and USS Oklahoma (BB-37) were permanently destroyed as a result of enemy action. Several other battleships have been sunk as targets, and USS Utah, demilitarized and converted into a target and training ship, was permanently destroyed at Pearl Harbor. The hulk of Oklahoma was salvaged and was lost at sea while being towed to the mainland for scrapping. Two American-built pre-dreadnought battleships, USS Mississippi (BB-23) and her sister USS Idaho (BB-24), were sunk in 1941 by German bombers during their World War II invasion of Greece. The ships had been sold to Greece in 1914, becoming Kilkis and Lemnos respectively.

== 1880s–1910s ==
Maine and Texas were part of the "New Navy" program of the 1880s. Texas and BB-1 to BB-4 were authorized as "coast defense battleships", but Maine was ordered as an armored cruiser and was only re-rated as a "second class battleship" when she turned out too slow to be a cruiser. The next group, BB-5 Kearsarge through BB-25 New Hampshire, followed general global pre-dreadnought design characteristics and entered service between 1900 and 1909. The definitive American pre-dreadnought was the penultimate class of the type, the Connecticut class, sporting the usual four-gun array of 12-inch (305 mm) weapons, a very heavy intermediate and secondary battery, and a moderate tertiary battery. They were good sea boats and heavily armed and armored for their type. The final American pre-dreadnought class, the Mississippi-class, were an experiment in increasing numbers with slower ships of limited range. The Navy soon rejected the concept and within 6 years of commissioning, sold these to Greece in 1914 to pay for a new super-dreadnought USS Idaho (BB-42).

The dreadnoughts, BB-26 South Carolina through BB-35 Texas, commissioned between 1910 and 1914, uniformly possessed twin turrets, introduced the superimposed turret arrangement that would later become standard on all battleships, and had relatively heavy armor and moderate speed (19–21 knots, 35–39 km/h, 22–24 mph). Five of the ten ships used the established vertical triple expansion (VTE) propulsion rather than faster direct-drive turbines, used by the British which had higher fuel consumption. The ships had 8 (South Carolina class), 10 (Delaware and Florida) or 12 (Wyoming class) 12-inch guns, or 10 (New York class) 14-inch (356 mm) guns. The dreadnoughts gave good service, the last two classes surviving through World War II before being scrapped. However, they had some faults that were never worked out, and the midships turrets in the ten and twelve-gun ships were located near boilers and high-pressure steam lines, a factor that made refrigeration very difficult and problematic in hot climates. One of their number, Texas (BB-35), is the last remaining American battleship of the pre–World War II era and the only remaining dreadnought in the world.

Next came the twelve Standards, beginning with BB-36 Nevada, commissioned over the period 1914 to 1920. The last ship commissioned was BB-48 West Virginia (BB-49 through 54 were also Standards, but were never commissioned, and scrapped under the Washington Naval Treaty). Oklahoma (BB-37) was the last American battleship commissioned with triple expansion machinery; all the other Standards used either geared steam turbines (Nevada, the Pennsylvania class, Idaho and Mississippi) or turbo-electric propulsion (New Mexico, the Tennessee and Colorado classes). The Standards were a group of ships with four turrets, oil fuel, a 21-knot (39 km/h; 24 mph) top speed, a 700-yard (640 m) tactical diameter at top speed, and heavy armor distributed on the "All or Nothing" principle. Armament was fairly consistent, starting with ten 14-inch guns in the Nevada class, twelve in the Pennsylvania, New Mexico and Tennessee classes, and eight 16-inch (406 mm) guns in the Colorado class.

== 1930s–1940s ==
After the 1930s "builders holiday," the USN commissioned ten more battleships of an entirely new style, the so-called fast battleship. These ships began with BB-55 North Carolina and the last ship laid down was BB-66 Kentucky (the last completed ship was BB-64 Wisconsin). These ships were a nearly clean break from previous American design practices. All ten ships were built to a Panamax design (technically post-Panamax, as they exceeded normal Panamax beam by two feet, but they were still able to transit the canal). They were fast battleships, and could travel with the aircraft carriers at cruising speed (their speed was not intended for that role, but rather so they could run down and destroy enemy battlecruisers). They possessed almost completely homogeneous main armament (nine 16-inch guns in each ship, the sole difference being an increase in length from 45 to 50 calibers with the Iowa-class vessels), very high speed relative to other American designs (28 knots, 52 km/h, 32 mph in the North Carolina and South Dakota classes, 33 knots, 61 km/h, 38 mph in the Iowa class), and moderate armor. The North Carolina class was of particular concern, as their protection was rated as only "adequate" against the 16-inch super-heavy shells. They had been designed with, and armored against, a battery of three quadruple 14-inch guns, then changed to triple 16-inch guns after the escalator clause in the Second London Naval Treaty had been triggered. Secondary armament in these ships was almost homogeneous as well: Except for South Dakota, configured as a flagship, the other nine ships of this group sported a uniform 20-gun 5-inch (127 mm) secondary battery (South Dakota deleted two 5-inch mounts to make room for flag facilities). Visually, the World War II ships are distinguished by their three-turret arrangement and the massive columnar mast that dominates the superstructure. The last ship, Wisconsin (BB-64), commissioned in 1944 (Wisconsin was approved last; however, Missouri (BB-63) was commissioned three months later, due to delays from additional aircraft carrier construction). Missouri (BB-63), famous for being the ship on which the Japanese Instrument of Surrender was signed, was the last battleship in the world to be decommissioned on 31 March 1992. Seven of these ten ships are still in existence. South Dakota, Washington and Indiana were scrapped, but the remainder are now museum ships. There was intended to be another class of five of these ships, the Montana class (BB-67 Montana through BB-71 Louisiana), but they were cancelled before being laid down in favor of a greater number of aircraft carriers. The Montana-class ships would have been built to a 60,000-ton post-Panamax design, and carried a greater number of guns (twelve 16-inch guns) and heavier armor than the other ships; otherwise they would have been homogeneous with the rest of the World War II battleships.

In October 2006, the last battleships, (USS Iowa and USS Wisconsin), were stricken from the Naval Registry.

== Key ==
Main guns	The number and type of the main battery guns
Armor	Waterline belt thickness
Displacement	Ship displacement at full load
Propulsion	Number of shafts, type of propulsion system, and top speed generated
Service	The dates work began and finished on the ship and its ultimate fate
Laid down	The date the keel began to be assembled
Launched	The date the ship was launched
Commissioned	The date the ship was commissioned

== Second-class battleship ==
=== USS Texas (1892) ===
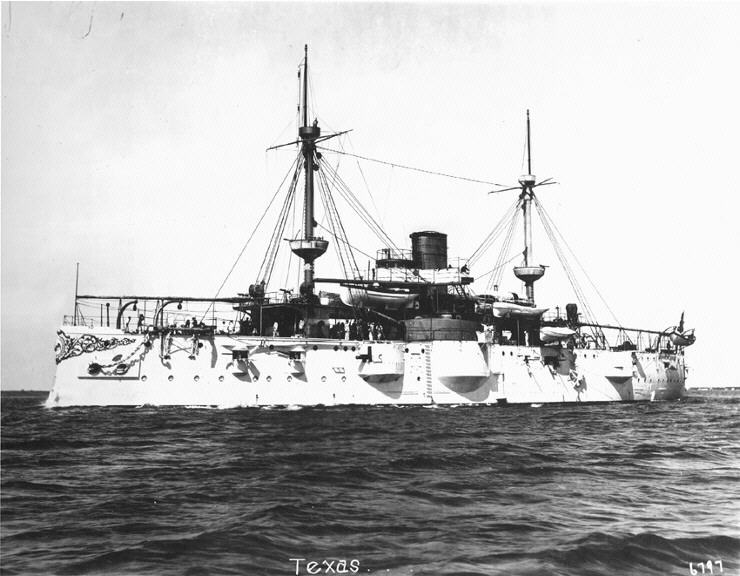
USS Texas

The acquisition of modern, European-built warships by Argentina, Brazil, and Chile had alarmed the United States. The straw that broke the camel's back was Brazil's commissioning of the battleship Riachuelo, which suddenly made the Brazilian Navy the strongest in the Americas. Congressman Hilary A. Herbert, chairman of the House Naval Affairs Committee, said of the situation, "if all this old navy of ours were drawn up in battle array in mid-ocean and confronted by the Riachuelo it is doubtful whether a single vessel bearing the American flag would get into port." Facing the possibility of enemy ironclads operating in American coastal waters, the Naval Consulting Board began planning a pair of ironclads of their own, which would be able to use all major American naval bases and have a minimum speed of 17 knots (31 km/h; 20 mph). The first of these two was USS Texas, 308 feet 10 inches (94.13 m) long, sporting an armor belt 12 inches (305 mm) thick, displacing 6,316 long tons (6,417 t), sailing at a top speed of 17.8 knots (33.0 km/h; 20.5 mph), and armed with two 35-caliber 12 in (305 mm) primary and six 30-caliber 6 in (152 mm) secondary guns.

Texas was authorized by Congress on 3 August 1886, but construction lagged until she was laid down on 1 June 1889. She was launched in the presence of the granddaughter of Sam Houston on 28 June 1892, and commissioned on 15 August 1895. Texas's early service revealed a number of structural issues, which was addressed via some reinforcement of various parts of the ship, and she ran aground near Newport, Rhode Island, in September 1896. This in turn revealed even more faults with Texas, as massive flooding easily disabled her in the shallow waters where she ran aground. After repairs, she joined the North Atlantic Squadron, briefly leaving for a Gulf Coast visit to Galveston and New Orleans that saw her beached on a mud bank off Galveston, an event whose aftermath gave Texas her nickname, "Old Hoodoo." After repairs, she returned to the North Atlantic Squadron and her patrols of the Eastern Seaboard. In the Spring of 1898, Texas's near-sister ship USS Maine (ACR-1) (the other of the two original coastal defense ships) was destroyed by an explosion in Havana's harbor, and the United States went to war with the Spanish Empire. An American fleet including Texas was at Key West, and was part of the Flying Squadron in its engagements with Spanish fortifications on the Cuban coast. She saw real surface fleet combat on 3 July at the Battle of Santiago de Cuba alongside USS Iowa, USS Gloucester, and USS Indiana against the fleet of Pascual Cervera y Topete as it tried to escape the American fleet and emerged with only light damage. After the war, Texas was decommissioned and refitted on two occasions before finally be declared obsolete in 1911 and permanently decommissioned and converted into a target ship in the same year. On 15 February 1911, Texas was christened as San Marcos to free the name up for the dreadnought USS Texas (BB-35), and was then sunk in the waters of Tangier Sound by USS New Hampshire's guns. The remains of the San Marcos continued to be used for gunnery practice after her sinking until January 1959, when vast quantities of explosives were used to bury her remains.

Ship	Main guns	Armor	Displacement	Propulsion	Service			
Ship	Main guns	Armor	Displacement	Propulsion	Laid down	Launched	Commissioned	Fate
USS Texas	2 x 12 in (305 mm)	12 in (305 mm)	6,316 long tons (6,417 t)	2 x steam engines 2 x screws 17.8 kn (33.0 km/h; 20.5 mph)	1 June 1889	28 June 1892	15 August 1895	Sunk as target ship, 21–22 March 1912

== Pre-dreadnought battleships ==
=== Indiana class ===
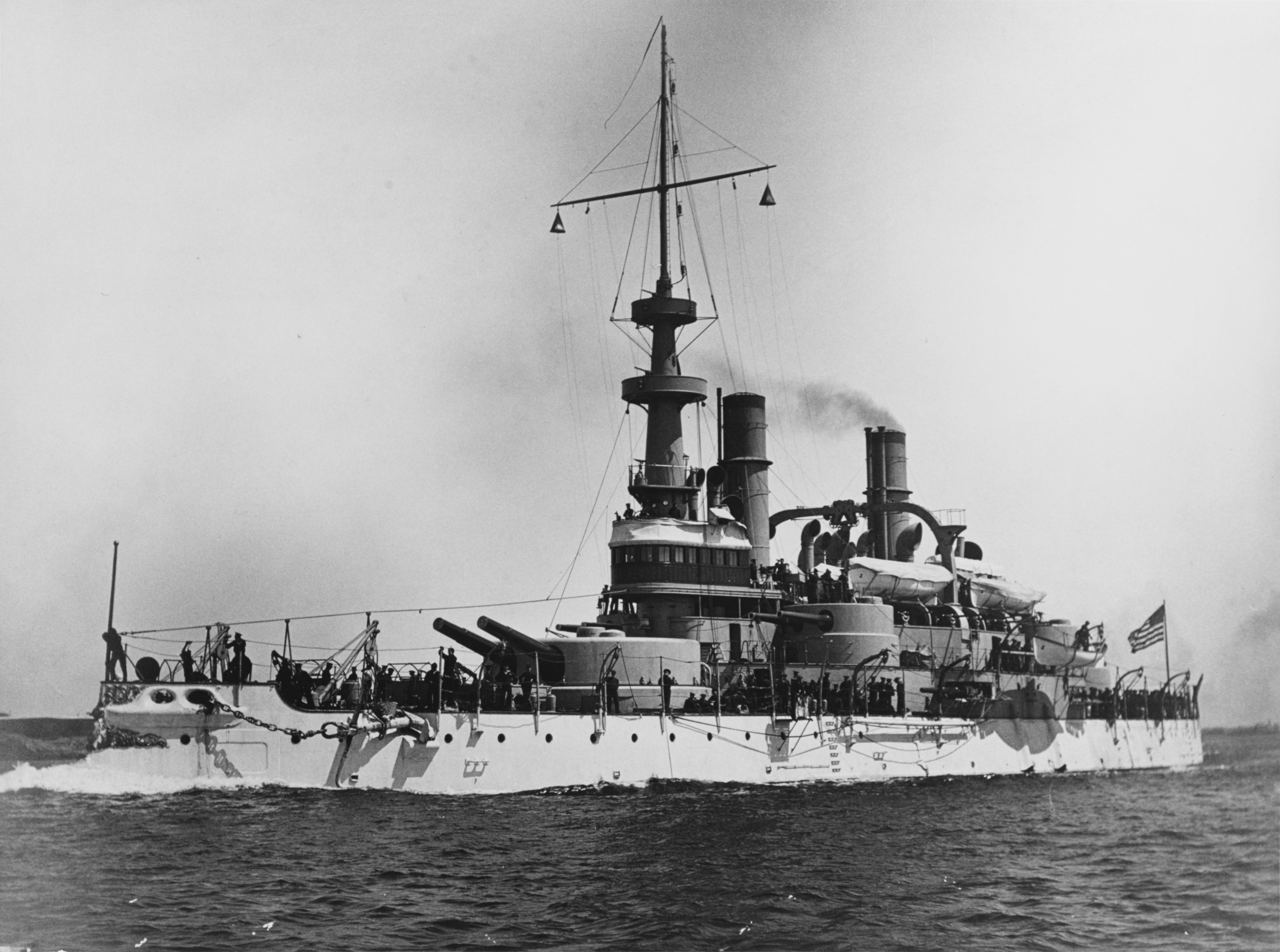
USS Indiana

Ship	Main guns	Armor	Displacement	Propulsion	Service			
Ship	Main guns	Armor	Displacement	Propulsion	Laid down	Launched	Commissioned	Fate
USS Indiana (BB-1)	4 × 13 in (330 mm)	18 in (457 mm)	10,288 long tons (10,453 t)	2 × Vertical triple expansion steam (VTE) engines 2 x screws 4 x boilers	7 May 1891	28 February 1893	20 November 1895	Sunk as a target, 1 November 1920; Sold for scrap, 19 March 1924
USS Massachusetts (BB-2)	4 × 13 in (330 mm)	18 in (457 mm)	10,288 long tons (10,453 t)	2 × Vertical triple expansion steam (VTE) engines 2 x screws 4 x boilers	25 June 1891	10 June 1893	10 June 1896; 2 May 1910; 9 June 1917	Scuttled, 6 January 1921
USS Oregon (BB-3)	4 × 13 in (330 mm)	18 in (457 mm)	10,288 long tons (10,453 t)	2 × Vertical triple expansion steam (VTE) engines 2 x screws 4 x boilers	19 November 1891	26 October 1893	15 July 1896; 29 August 1911	Sold for scrap, 15 March 1956

=== USS Iowa ===
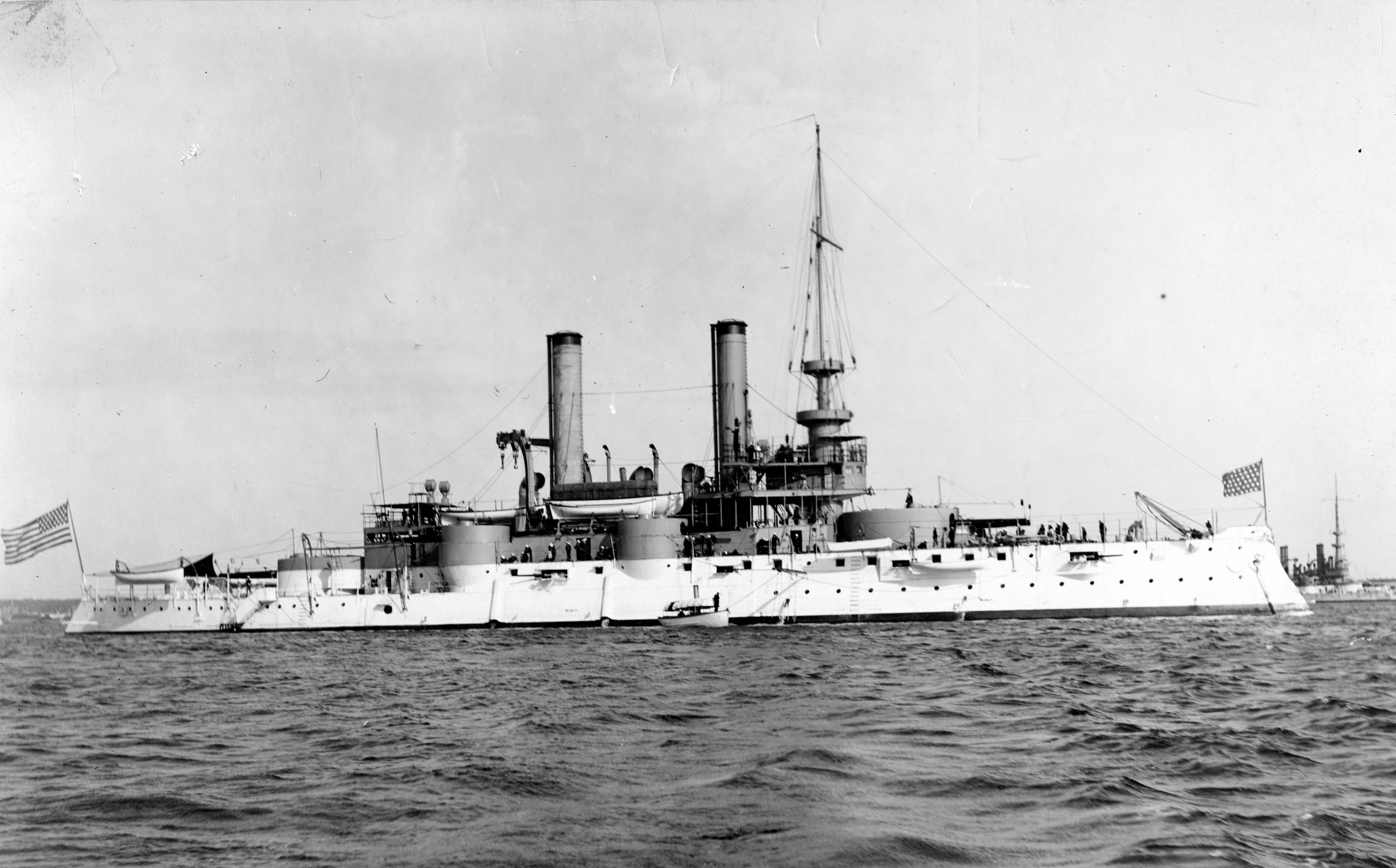
USS Iowa

Ship	Main guns	Armor	Displacement	Propulsion	Service			
Ship	Main guns	Armor	Displacement	Propulsion	Laid down	Launched	Commissioned	Fate
USS Iowa (BB-4)	4 × 12 in (305 mm)	14 in (356 mm)	11,346 long tons (11,528 t)	2 × Vertical triple expansion steam (VTE) engines 2 × screws 4 × boilers	5 August 1893	28 March 1896	16 June 1897	Sunk as gunnery target, 23 March 1923

=== Kearsarge class ===
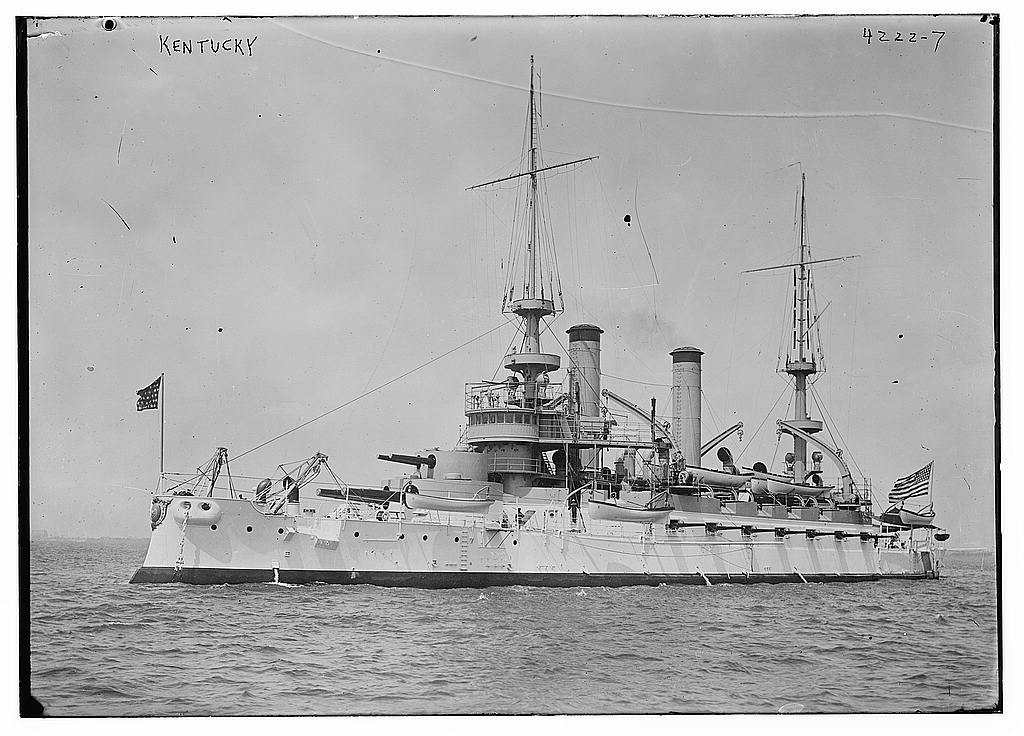
USS Kentucky

These two ships were authorized under the Act of 2 March 1895, and were both built by the Newport News Shipbuilding Company.

Ship	Main guns	Armor	Displacement	Propulsion	Service			
Ship	Main guns	Armor	Displacement	Propulsion	Laid down	Launched	Commissioned	Fate
USS Kearsarge (BB-5)	4 × 13 in (330 mm)	16.5 in (419 mm)	11,540 long tons (11,730 t)	2 × Vertical triple expansion steam (VTE) engines 2 × screws 5 × boilers	30 June 1896	24 March 1898	20 February 1900	Sold for scrap, 9 August 1955
USS Kentucky (BB-6)	4 × 13 in (330 mm)	16.5 in (419 mm)	11,540 long tons (11,730 t)	2 × Vertical triple expansion steam (VTE) engines 2 × screws 5 × boilers	30 June 1896	24 March 1898	15 May 1900	Sold for scrap, 24 March 1923

=== Illinois class ===
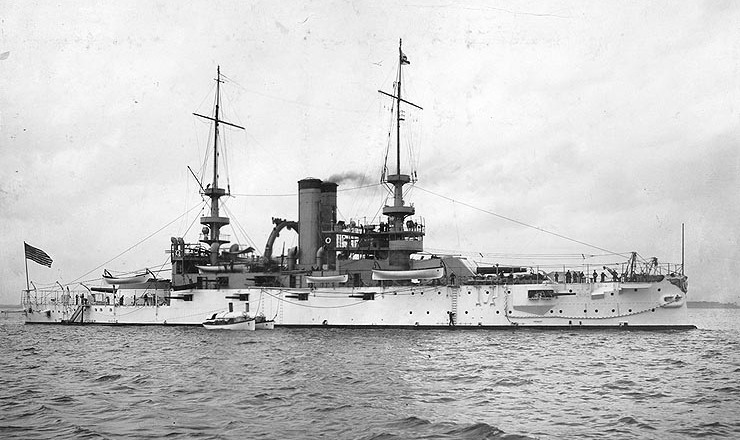
USS Illinois

- Displacement: 11,565 tons
- Armament: 4 × 13 in (330 mm) (2x2), 14 × 6 in (152 mm) (14x1), 16 × 6 pounders (2.7 kg) (16x1), 6 × 1 pounders (454 g) (6x1), 4 torpedo tubes
- Speed: 17 knots
- Ships in class: 3: USS Illinois, USS Alabama, and USS Wisconsin
- Commissioned: 16 October 1900 (Alabama)
- Decommissioned 15 May 1920 (Illinois, Wisconsin)
- Fate: Illinois transferred to New York Naval Militia 1921, renamed Prairie State 1941, scrapped 1956; Alabama sunk as target 1921; Wisconsin scrapped 1922.

Ship	Main guns	Armor	Displacement	Propulsion	Service			
Ship	Main guns	Armor	Displacement	Propulsion	Laid down	Launched	Commissioned	Fate
USS Illinois (BB-7)	4 x 13 in (330 mm)		12,250 long tons (12,450 t)		10 February 1897	4 October 1898	16 September 1901	Transferred to New York Naval Militia 1921, renamed Prairie State 1941, scrapped 1956
USS Alabama (BB-8)	4 x 13 in (330 mm)		12,250 long tons (12,450 t)		2 December 1896	18 May 1898	16 October 1900	Sunk as target 1921
USS Wisconsin (BB-9)	4 x 13 in (330 mm)		12,250 long tons (12,450 t)		9 February 1897	26 November 1898	4 February 1901	Scrapped 1922

=== Maine class ===
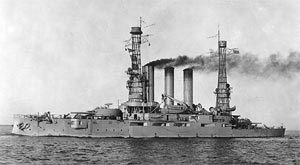
USS Maine

Ship	Main guns	Armor	Displacement	Propulsion	Service			
Ship	Main guns	Armor	Displacement	Propulsion	Laid down	Launched	Commissioned	Fate
USS Maine (BB-10)	4 × 12 in (300 mm)	11 in (280 mm)	12,500 long tons (12,700 t)		15 February 1899	27 July 1901	29 December 1902	Scrapped 1922
USS Missouri (BB-11)	4 × 12 in (300 mm)	11 in (280 mm)	12,500 long tons (12,700 t)		7 February 1900	28 December 1901	1 December 1903	Scrapped 1922
USS Ohio (BB-12)	4 × 12 in (300 mm)	11 in (280 mm)	12,500 long tons (12,700 t)		22 April 1899	18 May 1901	4 October 1904	Scrapped 1922

=== Virginia class ===
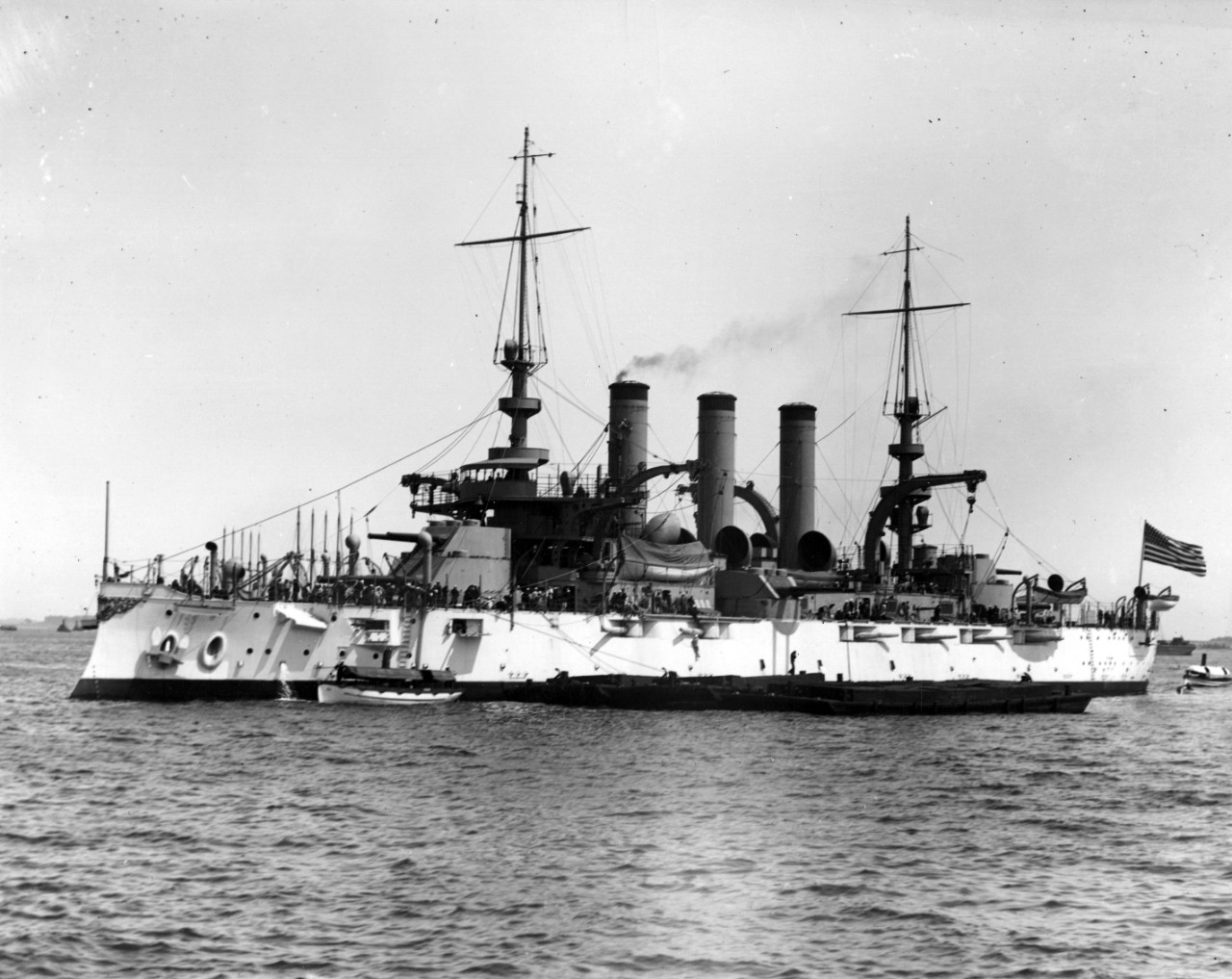
USS New Jersey

- Displacement: 15,000 tons
- Armament: 4 × 12 in (305 mm) (2x2), 8 × 8 in (203 mm) (4x2), 12 × 6 in (152 mm) guns (12x1), 24 1-pounders (24x1), 4 × 21 in (533 mm) torpedo tubes
- Armor: Belt 11 inches; Turret 12 inches; Deck 3 inches
- Speed: 19 knots
- Ships in class: 5: USS Virginia, USS Nebraska, USS Georgia, USS New Jersey, and USS Rhode Island
- Commissioned: 19 February 1906 (Rhode Island)
- Decommissioned: 13 August 1920 (Virginia)
- Fate: Virginia and New Jersey sunk as targets, remainder sold for scrap, 1923

Ship	Main guns	Armor	Displacement	Propulsion	Service			
Ship	Main guns	Armor	Displacement	Propulsion	Laid down	Launched	Commissioned	Fate
USS Virginia (BB-13)	4 × 12 in (305 mm) (2x2)		15,000 tons		21 May 1902	5 April 1904	7 May 1906	Sunk as target
USS Nebraska (BB-14)	4 × 12 in (305 mm) (2x2)		15,000 tons		4 July 1902	7 October 1904	1 July 1907	Sold for scrap, 1923
USS Georgia (BB-15)	4 × 12 in (305 mm) (2x2)		15,000 tons		31 August 1901	11 October 1904	24 September 1906	Sold for scrap, 1923
USS New Jersey (BB-16)	4 × 12 in (305 mm) (2x2)		15,000 tons		3 May 1902	10 November 1904	12 May 1906	Sunk as target
USS Rhode Island (BB-17)	4 × 12 in (305 mm) (2x2)		15,000 tons		1 May 1902	17 May 1904	19 February 1906	Sold for scrap, 1923

=== Connecticut class ===
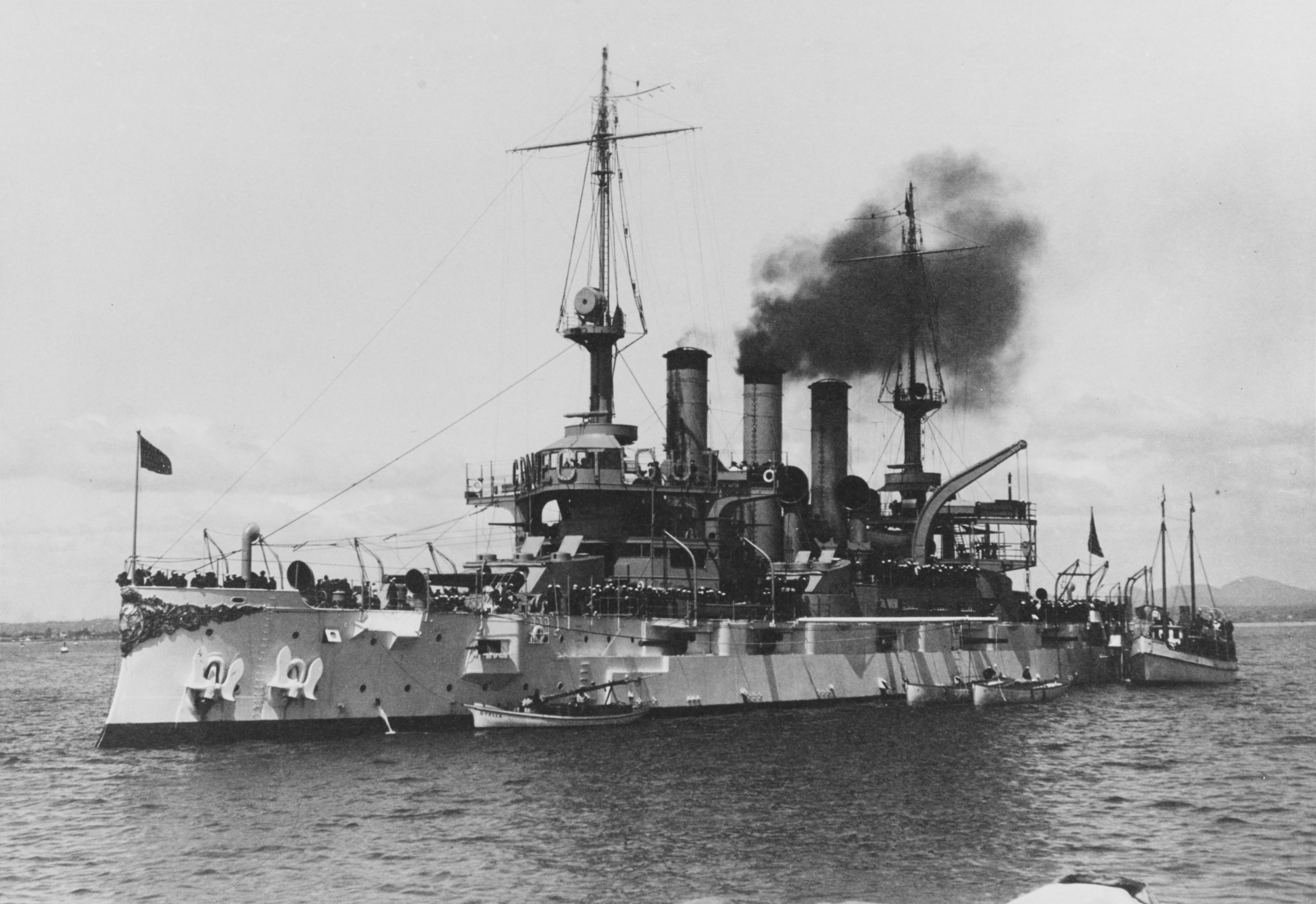
USS Connecticut

- Displacement: 16,000 tons
- Armament: 4 × 12 in (305 mm) (2x2), 8 × 8 in (203 mm) (4x2), 12 × 7 in (178 mm) (12x1), 10 × 3 in (76 mm) (10x1), 4 × 21 in (533 mm) torpedo tubes
- Armor: 11in Belt / 3in Deck
- Speed: 18 knots
- Ships in class: 6: USS Connecticut, USS Louisiana, USS Vermont, USS Kansas, USS Minnesota, and USS New Hampshire
- Commissioned: 2 June 1906 (Louisiana)
- Decommissioned: 1 March 1923 (Connecticut)
- Fate: Scrapped 1923–24

Ship	Main guns	Armor	Displacement	Propulsion	Service			
Ship	Main guns	Armor	Displacement	Propulsion	Laid down	Launched	Commissioned	Fate
USS Connecticut (BB-18)	4 × 12 in (305 mm) (2x2)		16,000 tons		10 March 1903	29 September 1904	29 September 1906	Scrapped 1923–24
USS Louisiana (BB-19)	4 × 12 in (305 mm) (2x2)		16,000 tons		7 February 1903	27 August 1904	2 June 1906	Scrapped 1923–24
USS Vermont (BB-20)	4 × 12 in (305 mm) (2x2)		16,000 tons		21 May 1904	31 August 1905	4 March 1907	Scrapped 1923–24
USS Kansas (BB-21)	4 × 12 in (305 mm) (2x2)		16,000 tons		10 February 1904	12 August 1905	18 April 1907	Scrapped 1923–24
USS Minnesota (BB-22)	4 × 12 in (305 mm) (2x2)		16,000 tons		27 October 1903	8 April 1905	9 March 1907	Scrapped 1923–24
USS New Hampshire (BB-25)	4 × 12 in (305 mm) (2x2)		16,000 tons		1 May 1905	30 June 1906	19 March 1908	Scrapped 1923–24

=== Mississippi class ===
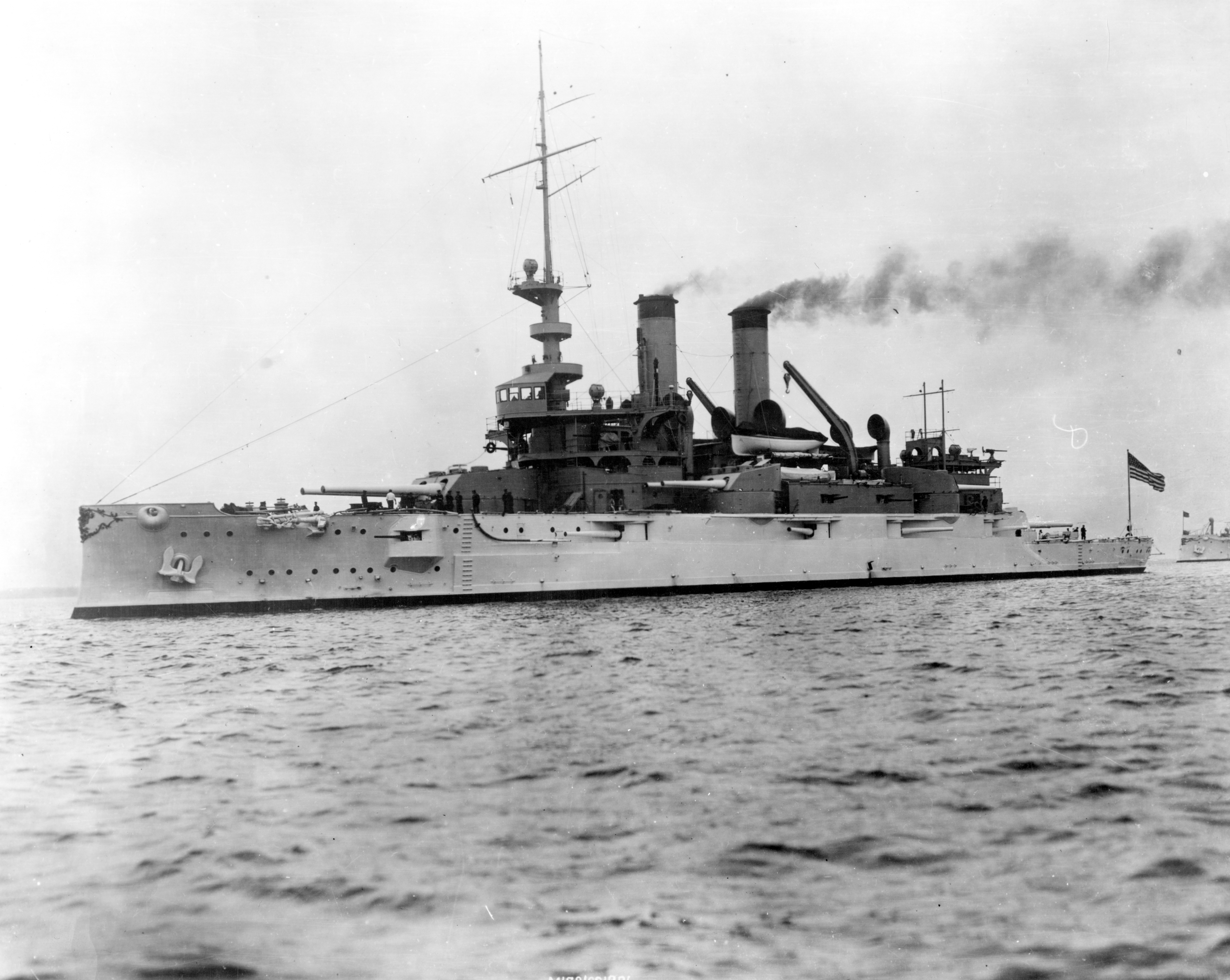
USS Mississippi

- Displacement: 13,000 tons
- Armament: 4 × 12 in (305 mm) (2 × 2), 8 × 8 in (203 mm) (4 × 2), 8 × 7 in (178 mm) (8x1), 12 × 3 in (76 mm) (12 × 1), 6 × 3 pounder gun (6 × 1), 2 × 1-pounder Mark 6 (2 × 1), 6 × .30-caliber machine guns (6 × 1), 2 × 21 in (533 mm) torpedo tubes
- Armor:
- Speed: 17 knots
- Ships in class: 2: USS Mississippi and USS Idaho
- Commissioned: 1 February 1908 (Mississippi)
- Fate: Decommissioned 30 July 1914 and sold to Greece. Kilkis (ex-Mississippi) and Limnos (ex-Idaho) sunk by German bombers in April 1941.

Ship	Main guns	Armor	Displacement	Propulsion	Service			
Ship	Main guns	Armor	Displacement	Propulsion	Laid down	Launched	Commissioned	Fate
USS Mississippi (BB-23)	4 × 12 in (305 mm) (2 × 2)		13,000 tons		12 May 1904	30 September 1905	1 February 1908	Sold to Greece 1914; sunk by German aircraft in April 1941; sold for scrap in the 1950s
USS Idaho (BB-24)	4 × 12 in (305 mm) (2 × 2)		13,000 tons		12 May 1904	9 December 1905	1 April 1908	Sold to Greece 1914; sunk by German aircraft in April 1941; sold for scrap in the 1950s

== Dreadnought battleships ==
=== South Carolina class ===
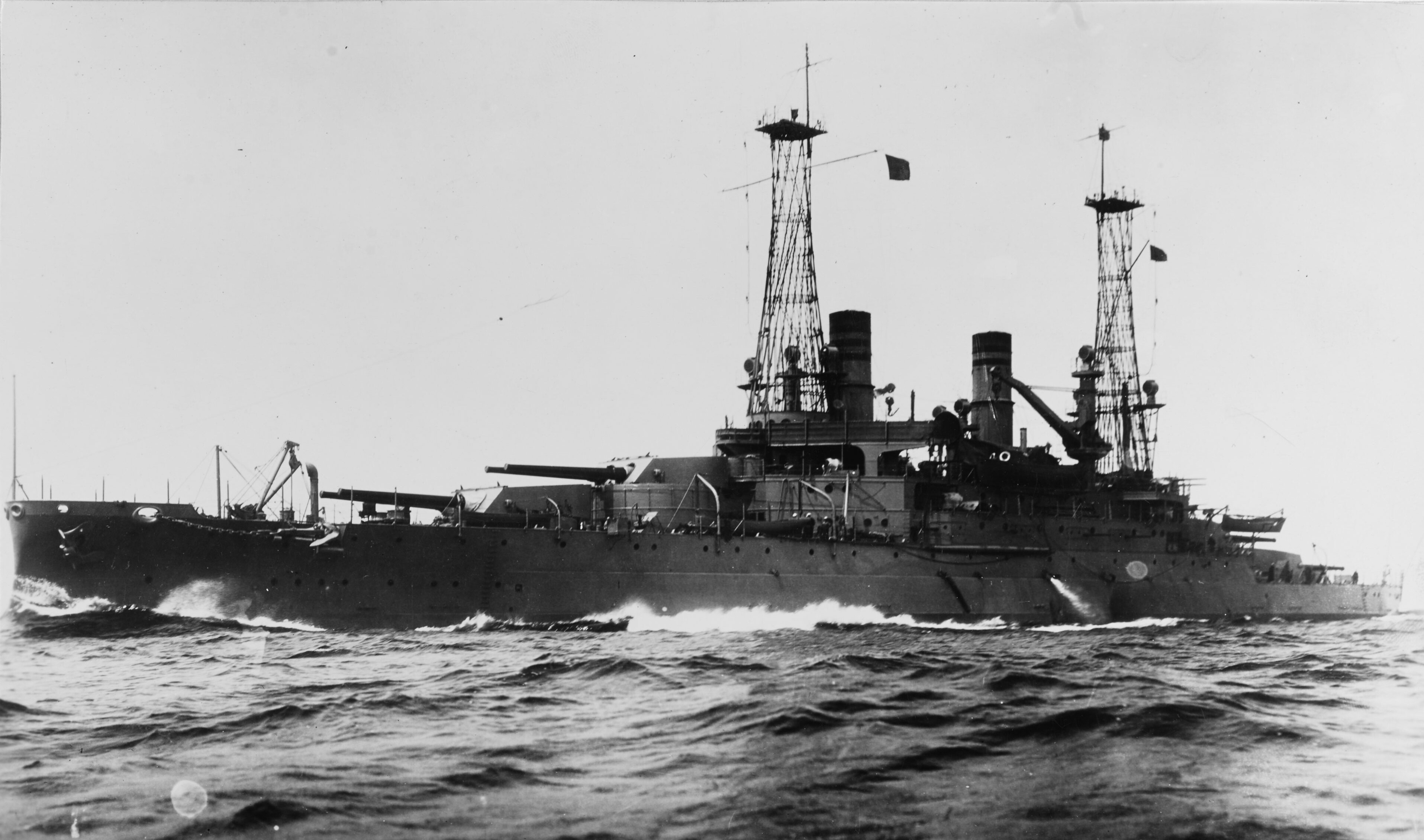
USS Michigan

- Displacement: 16,000 tons
- Armament: 8 × 12 in (305 mm) guns (4 × 2), 22 × 3 in (76 mm) (22x1), 2 × 3 pounder (2 × 1), 2 × 21 in (533 mm) torpedo tubes
- Armor: 12” belt, 2.5" deck
- Speed: 18 knots
- Ships in class: 2: USS South Carolina and USS Michigan
- Commissioned: 4 January 1910 (Michigan)
- Decommissioned: 11 February 1922 (Michigan)
- Fate: Scrapped 1924

Ship	Main guns	Armor	Displacement	Propulsion	Service			
Ship	Main guns	Armor	Displacement	Propulsion	Laid down	Launched	Commissioned	Fate
USS South Carolina (BB-26)	8 × 12 in (305 mm) (4 × 2)		16,000 tons		18 December 1906	11 July 1908	1 March 1910	Broken up as a result of the Washington Naval Treaty, 1924
USS Michigan (BB-27)	8 × 12 in (305 mm) (4 × 2)		16,000 tons		17 December 1906	26 May 1908	4 January 1910	Broken up as a result of the Washington Naval Treaty, 1924

=== Delaware class ===
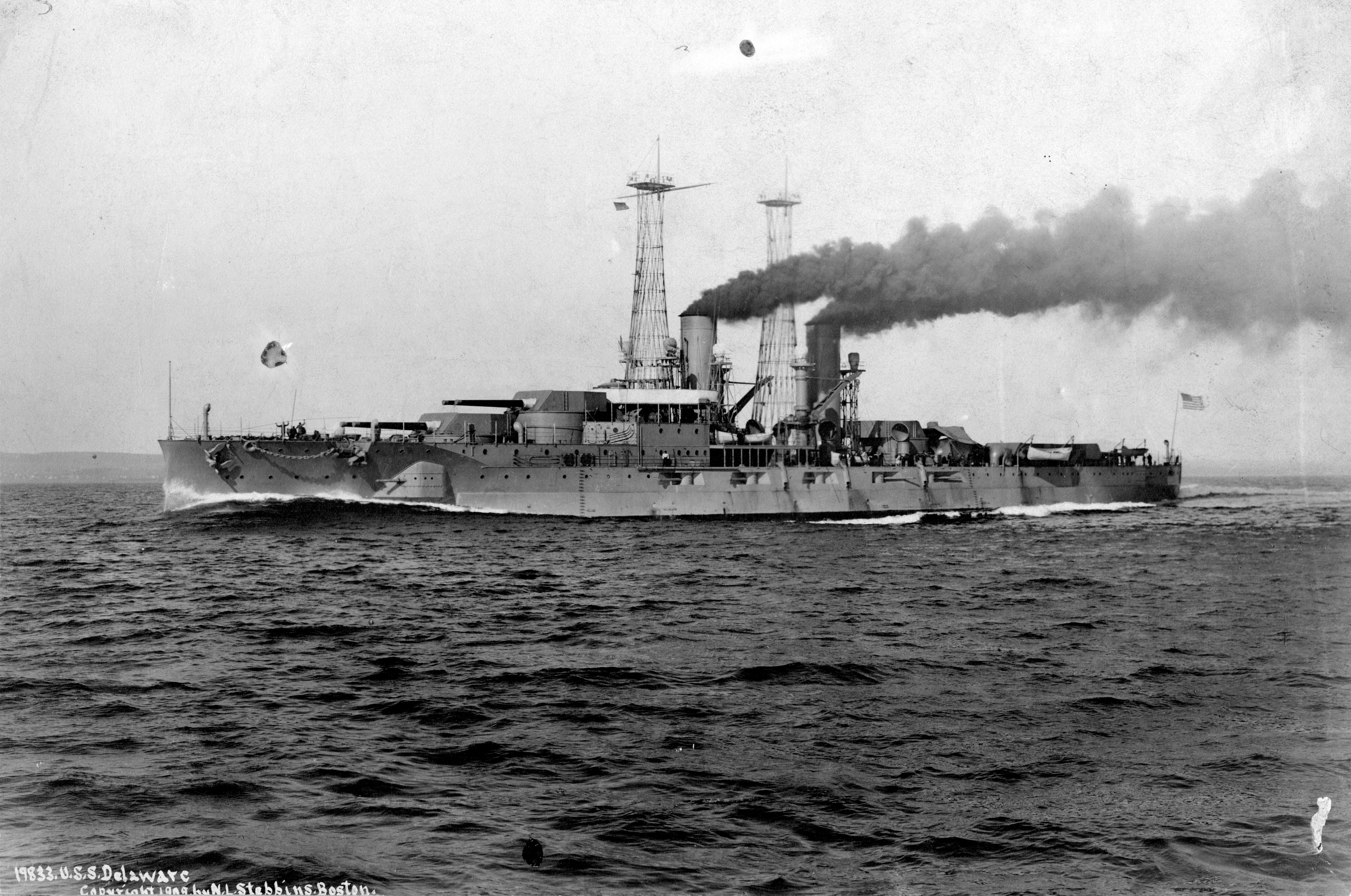
USS Delaware

- Displacement: 20,380 tons
- Armament: 10 × 12 in (305 mm) (5x2), 14 × 5 in (127 mm) (14x1), 22 × 3 in (76 mm) (22x1), 2 × 3 pounder (2x1) guns, 2 × 21 in (533 mm) torpedo tubes
- Armor:
- Speed: 21 knots
- Ships in class: 2: USS Delaware and USS North Dakota
- Commissioned: 4 April 1910 (Delaware)
- Decommissioned: 22 November 1923 (North Dakota)
- Fate: Delaware scrapped 1924; North Dakota converted to target ship 1924, scrapped 1931

Ship	Main guns	Armor	Displacement	Propulsion	Service				
Ship	Main guns	Armor	Displacement	Propulsion	Laid down	Launched	Commissioned	Decommissioned	Fate
USS Delaware (BB-28)	10 × 12 in (305 mm) (5 × 2)	9–11 in (229 – 279 mm)	20,380 tons	2 × sets Vertical triple expansion Delaware; Curtis Steam turbines North Dakota; 2 × screws	11 November 1907	6 February 1909	4 April 1910	10 November 1923	Broken up at Baltimore, 1924
USS North Dakota (BB-29)	10 × 12 in (305 mm) (5 × 2)	9–11 in (229 – 279 mm)	20,380 tons	2 × sets Vertical triple expansion Delaware; Curtis Steam turbines North Dakota; 2 × screws	16 December 1907	10 November 1908	11 April 1910	22 November 1923	Broken up at Baltimore, 1931

=== Florida class ===
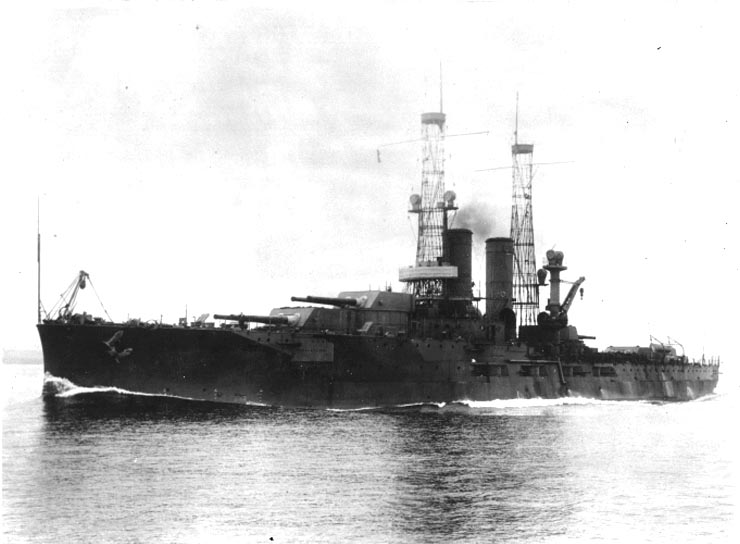
USS Utah

- Displacement: 21,800 tons
- Armament: 10 × 12 in (305 mm) (5x2), 16 × 5 in (127 mm) (16x1), 2 × 21 in (533 mm) torpedo tubes
- Armor:
- Speed: 21 knots
- Ships in class: 2: USS Florida and USS Utah
- Commissioned: 31 August 1911 (Utah)
- Decommissioned: 16 February 1931 (Florida)
- Fate: Florida scrapped in 1932, Utah became target ship (AG-16) in 1931, sunk at Pearl Harbor in 1941

Ship	Main guns	Armor	Displacement	Propulsion	Service				
Ship	Main guns	Armor	Displacement	Propulsion	Laid down	Launched	Commissioned	Decommissioned	Fate
USS Florida (BB-30)	10 × 12 in (305 mm) (5x2)	9–11 in (229–279 mm)	21,800 tons	4 × Parsons steam turbine 4 × screws	8 March 1909	12 May 1910	15 September 1911	16 February 1931	Broken up at Philadelphia, 1931
USS Utah (BB-31)	10 × 12 in (305 mm) (5x2)	9–11 in (229–279 mm)	21,800 tons	4 × Parsons steam turbine 4 × screws	9 March 1909	23 December 1909	31 August 1911	5 September 1944	Sunk during the attack on Pearl Harbor, 7 December 1941

=== Wyoming class ===
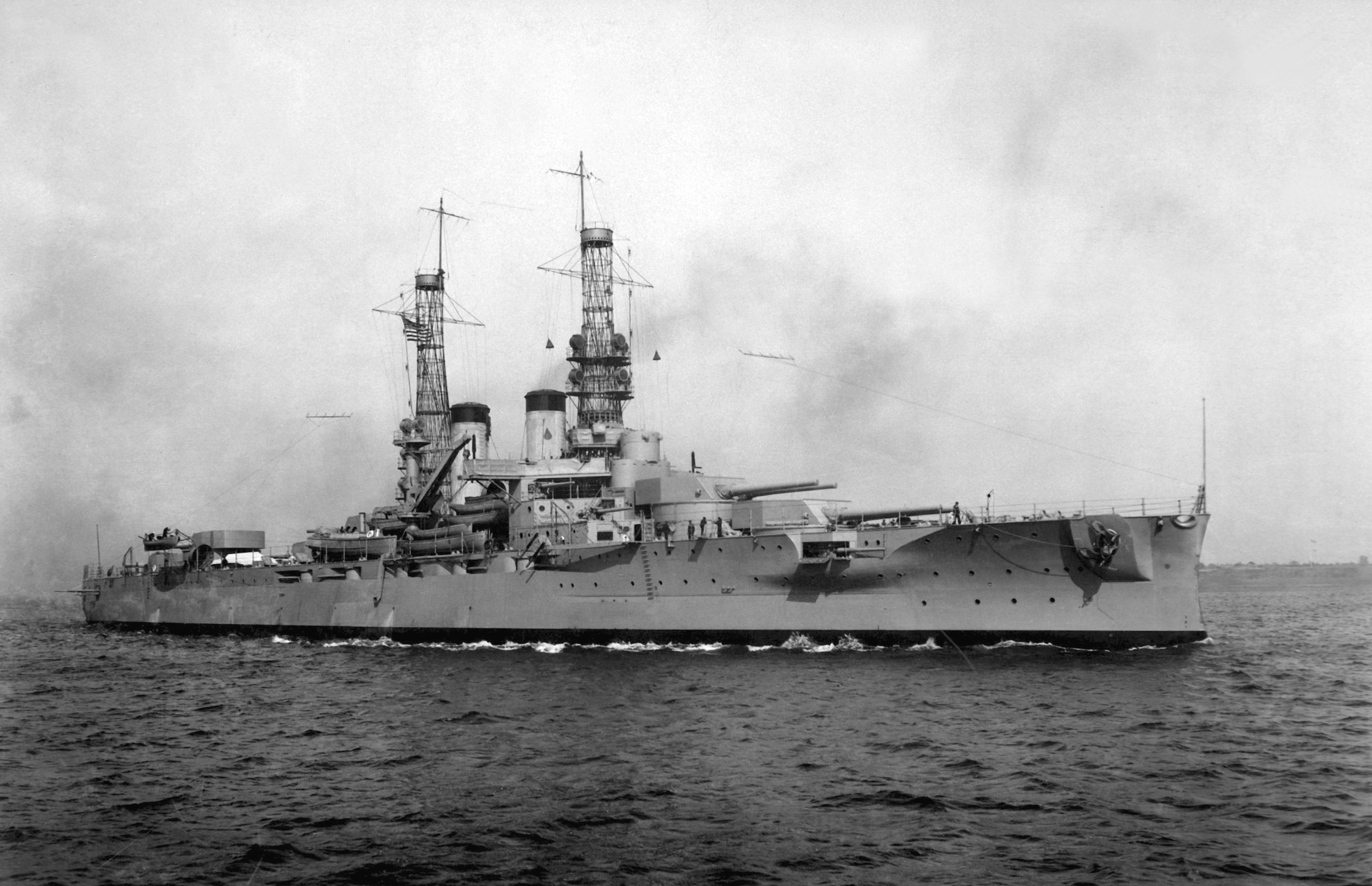
USS Arkansas

- Displacement: 26,000 tons
- Armament: 12 × 12 in (305 mm) (6x2), 21 × 5 in (127 mm) (21x1), two 3-inch (3x1), 2 × 21 in (533 mm) torpedo tubes
- Armor: 11in Belt / 2in Deck
- Speed: 20.5 knots
- Ships in class: 2: USS Wyoming and USS Arkansas
- Commissioned: 17 September 1912 (Arkansas)
- Decommissioned: 1 August 1947 (Wyoming)
- Fate: Wyoming became a training ship (AG-17) in 1931, scrapped in 1947. Arkansas sunk at Operation Crossroads in 1946

Ship	Main guns	Armor	Displacement	Propulsion	Service				
Ship	Main guns	Armor	Displacement	Propulsion	Laid down	Launched	Commissioned	Decommissioned	Fate
USS Wyoming (BB-32)	12 × 12 in (305 mm) (6x2)	5–11 in (127–279 mm)	26,000 tons	4 × Parsons steam turbines 4 × screws	9 February 1910	25 May 1911	25 September 1912	1 August 1947	Struck 16 December 1947; Sold for scrap, 30 October 1947
USS Arkansas (BB-33)	12 × 12 in (305 mm) (6x2)	5–11 in (127–279 mm)	26,000 tons	4 × Parsons steam turbines 4 × screws	25 January 1910	14 January 1911	17 September 1912	29 July 1946	Struck 15 August 1946; Sunk on 25 July 1946, as part of Operation Crossroads

=== New York class ===
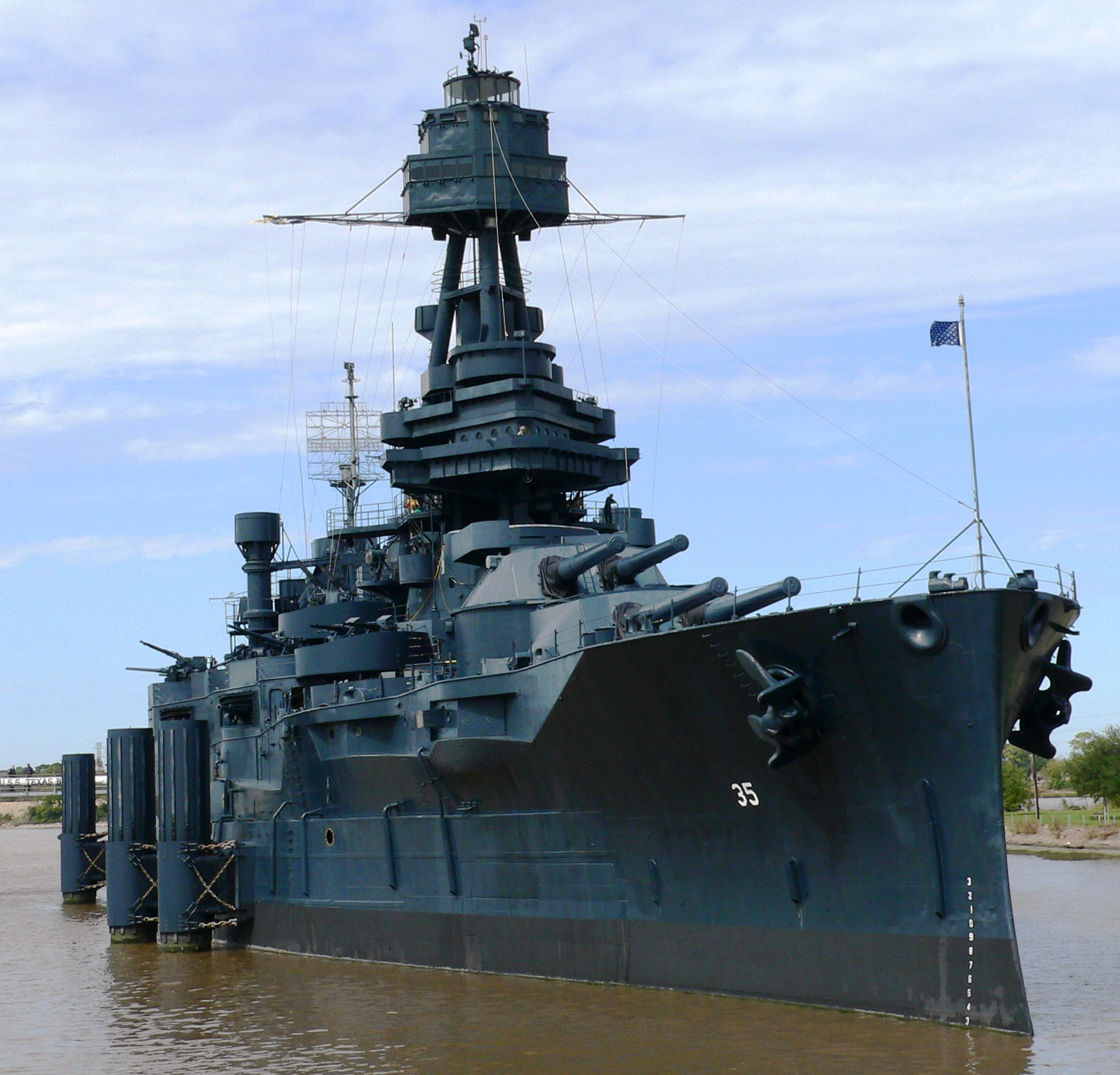
USS Texas

- Displacement: 27,200 tons
- Armament: 10 × 14 in (356 mm) (5x2), 21 5-inch (21x1), two 3-inch (2x1), 2 × 21 in (533 mm) torpedo tubes
- Armor: 12in Belt
- Speed: 21 knots
- Ships in class: 2: USS New York and USS Texas
- Commissioned: 12 March 1914 (Texas)
- Decommissioned: 21 April 1948 (Texas)
- Fate: New York sunk as target 1948; Texas preserved as a memorial 1948

Ship	Main guns	Armor	Displacement	Propulsion	Service				
Ship	Main guns	Armor	Displacement	Propulsion	Laid down	Launched	Commissioned	Decommissioned	Fate
USS New York (BB-34)	10 × 14 in (356 mm) (5x2)	10–12 in (254–305 mm)	27,200 tons	2 × screws 2 × triple-expansion steam engines	11 September 1911	30 October 1912	15 May 1914	29 August 1946	Struck 13 July 1948; Sunk as target, 8 July 1948
USS Texas (BB-35)	10 × 14 in (356 mm) (5x2)	10–12 in (254–305 mm)	27,200 tons	2 × screws 2 × triple-expansion steam engines	17 April 1911	18 May 1912	12 March 1914	21 April 1948	Struck 30 April 1948; Museum ship under restoration in Galveston, Texas

== Standard-type battleships ==
The so-called "Standard-type" was a series of battleships ordered between 1911 and 1916, and incorporating a number of new features including "all or nothing" armor. Twelve of these battleships were constructed across five classes, and were commissioned between 1916 and 1923. The older ships underwent major reconstructions during the late 1920s and early 1930s.

=== Nevada class ===
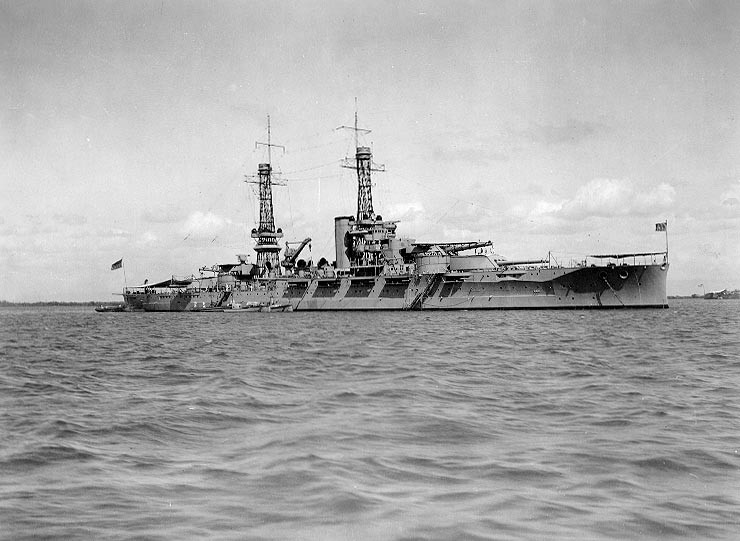
USS Oklahoma

- Displacement: 27,500 tons
- Armament: 10 × 14 in (356 mm) (2x3, 2x2), 21 × 5 in (127 mm) (21x1), 4 × 21 in (533 mm) torpedo tubes
- Armor:13.5in Belt / 2.9in Deck
- Speed: 20 knots
- Ships in class: 2: USS Nevada and USS Oklahoma
- Commissioned: 11 March 1916 (Nevada)
- Decommissioned: 29 August 1946 (Nevada)
- Fate: Nevada sunk as target 1948; Oklahoma sunk at Pearl Harbor in 1941, raised and stripped of salvageable parts, sunk en route to scrapping 1947

Ship	Main guns	Armor	Displacement	Propulsion	Service			
Ship	Main guns	Armor	Displacement	Propulsion	Laid down	Launched	Commissioned	Fate
USS Nevada (BB-36)	10 × 14 in (356 mm) (2x3, 2x2)	8–13.5 in (203–343 mm)	27,500 tons	2 × screw propellers 2 × steam turbines with geared cruising turbines	4 November 1912	11 July 1914	11 March 1916	Struck 12 August 1948; Sunk as a target 31 July 1948
USS Oklahoma (BB-37)	10 × 14 in (356 mm) (2x3, 2x2)	8–13.5 in (203–343 mm)	27,500 tons	2 × screw propellers 2 × triple-expansion steam engines	26 October 1912	23 March 1914	2 May 1916	Struck 1 September 1944; Hulk sank while under tow, 17 May 1947

=== Pennsylvania class ===
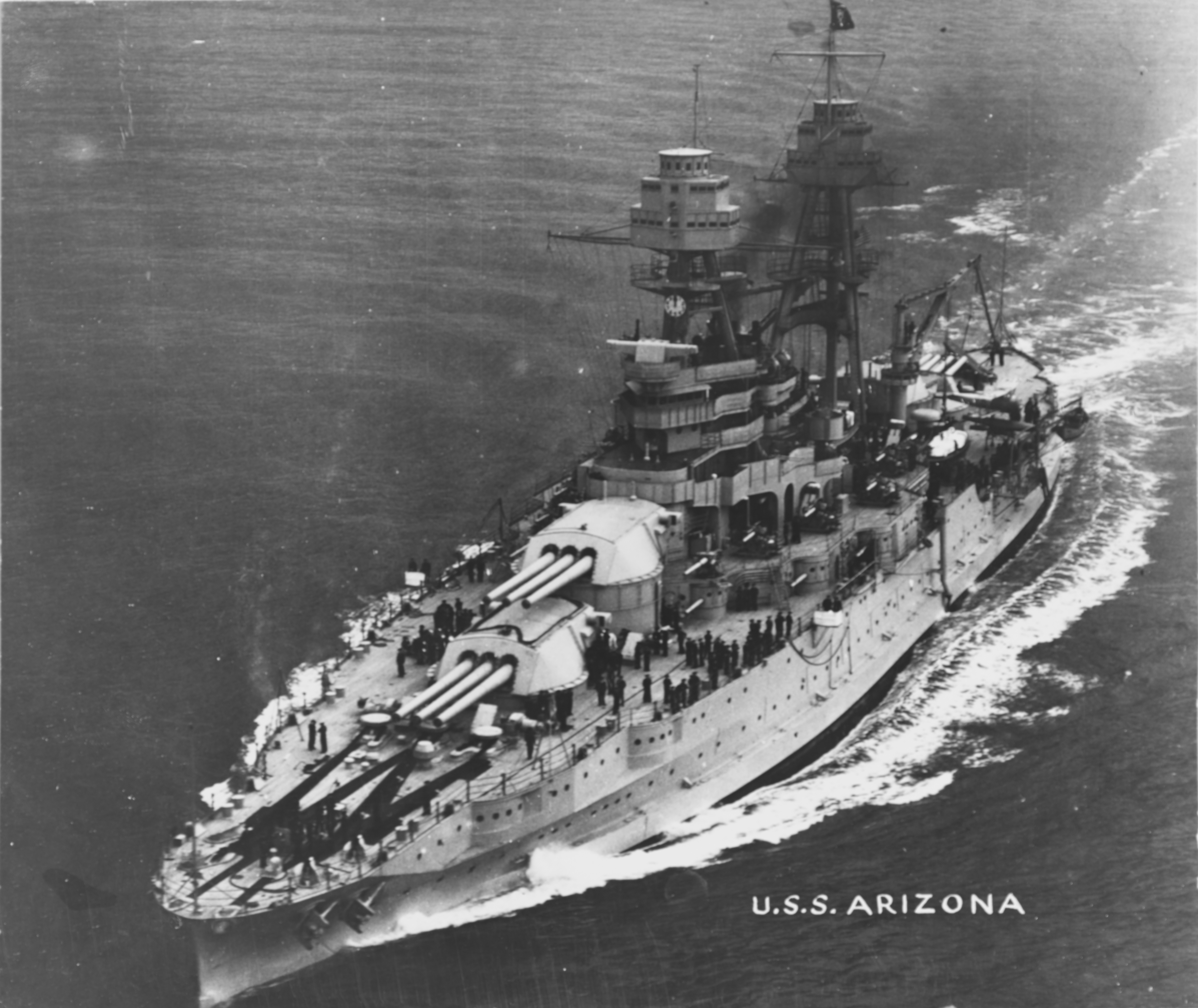
USS Arizona

- Displacement: 31,400 tons
- Armament: 12 × 14 in (356 mm) (4x3), 22 × 5 in (127 mm) (22x1), 4 × 3 in (76 mm) (4x1), 2 × 21 in (533 mm) torpedo tubes
- Armor: 13.5in Belt / 3in Deck
- Speed: 21 knots
- Ships in class: 2: USS Pennsylvania and USS Arizona
- Commissioned: both in 1916
- Fate: Pennsylvania sunk after Operation Crossroads in 1946, Arizona destroyed at Pearl Harbor in 1941, designated as a memorial.

Ship	Main guns	Armor	Displacement	Propulsion	Service				
Ship	Main guns	Armor	Displacement	Propulsion	Laid down	Launched	Commissioned	Decommissioned	Fate
USS Pennsylvania (BB-38)	12 × 14 in (356 mm) (4x3)	8–13.5 in (203–343 mm)	31,400 tons	4 × screws 4 × sets of Curtis (Pennsylvania) or Parsons (Arizona) steam turbines with geared cruising turbines	27 October 1913	16 March 1915	12 June 1916	29 August 1946	Target ship, Operation Crossroads; scuttled 10 February 1948
USS Arizona (BB-39)	12 × 14 in (356 mm) (4x3)	8–13.5 in (203–343 mm)	31,400 tons	4 × screws 4 × sets of Curtis (Pennsylvania) or Parsons (Arizona) steam turbines with geared cruising turbines	16 March 1914	19 June 1915	17 October 1916	29 December 1941	Sunk during the attack on Pearl Harbor, 7 December 1941

=== New Mexico class ===
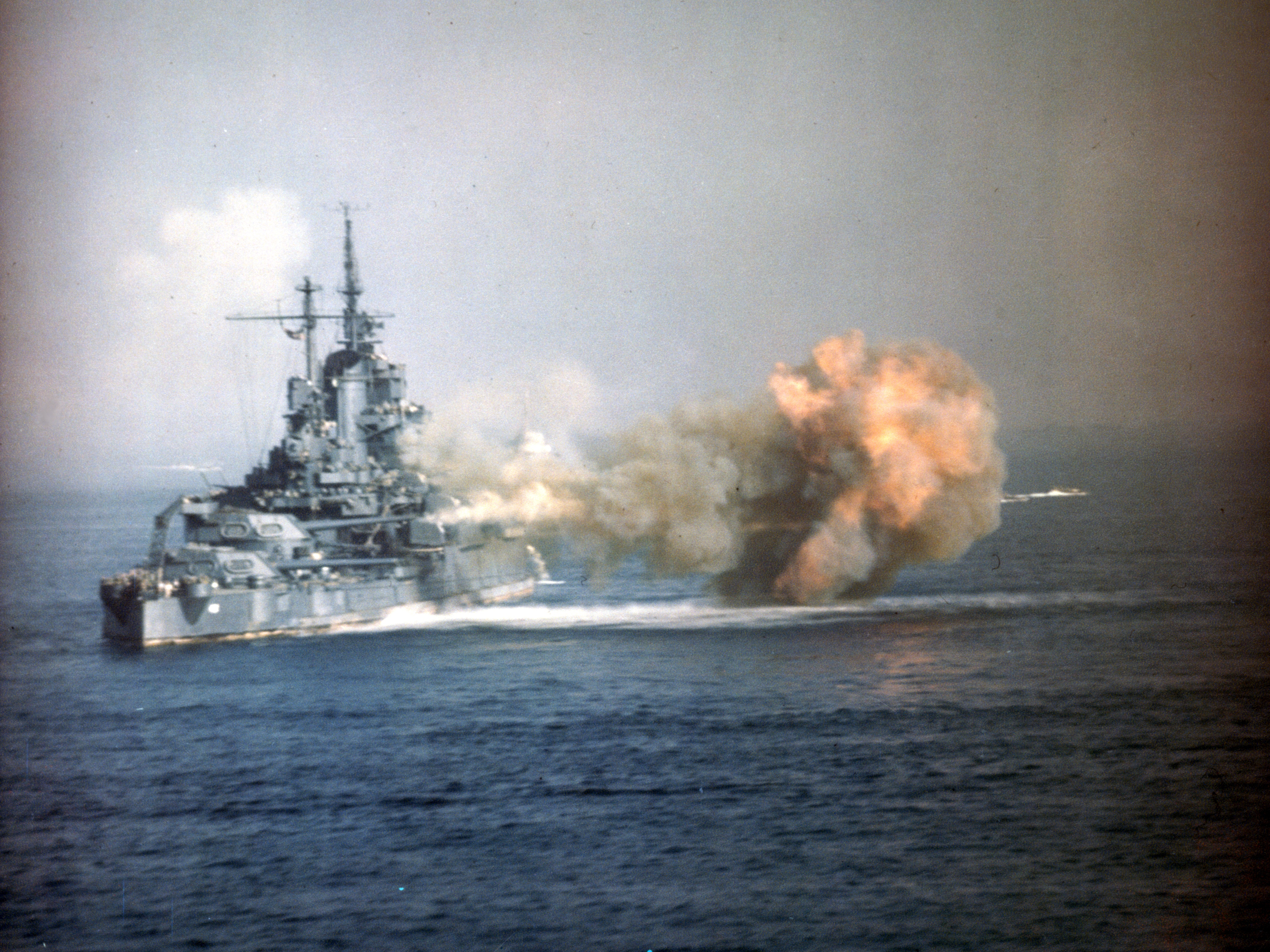
USS Idaho

- Displacement: 32,000 tons
- Armament: 12 × 14 in (356 mm) (4x3), 14 × 5 in (127 mm) (14x1), 2 × 21 in (533 mm) torpedo tubes
- Armor: 13.5in Belt / 3.5in Deck
- Speed: 21 knots
- Ships in class: 3: USS New Mexico, USS Mississippi, and USS Idaho
- Commissioned: 18 December 1917 (Mississippi)
- Decommissioned: 17 September 1956 (Mississippi)
- Fate: New Mexico & Idaho scrapped 1947; Mississippi converted to trials ship (AG-128) 1946, scrapped 1956

Ship	Main guns	Armor	Displacement	Propulsion	Service				
Ship	Main guns	Armor	Displacement	Propulsion	Laid down	Launched	Commissioned	Decommissioned	Fate
USS New Mexico (BB-40)	12 × 14 in (356 mm) (4x3)	13.5 in Belt / 3.5 in Deck	32,000	4 × screws turbo-electric transmission	14 October 1915	13 April 1917	20 May 1918	19 July 1946	Struck 25 February 1947; Broken up at Newark, 1947
USS Mississippi (BB-41)	12 × 14 in (356 mm) (4x3)	13.5 in Belt / 3.5 in Deck	32,000	4 × steam turbines 4 × screw propellers	5 April 1915	25 January 1917	18 December 1917	17 September 1956	Struck 17 September 1956; Broken up at Baltimore, 1956
USS Idaho (BB-42)	12 × 14 in (356 mm) (4x3)	13.5 in Belt / 3.5 in Deck	32,000	4 × steam turbines 4 × screw propellers	20 January 1915	30 June 1917	24 March 1919	3 July 1946	Broken up at Newark, 1947

=== Tennessee class ===
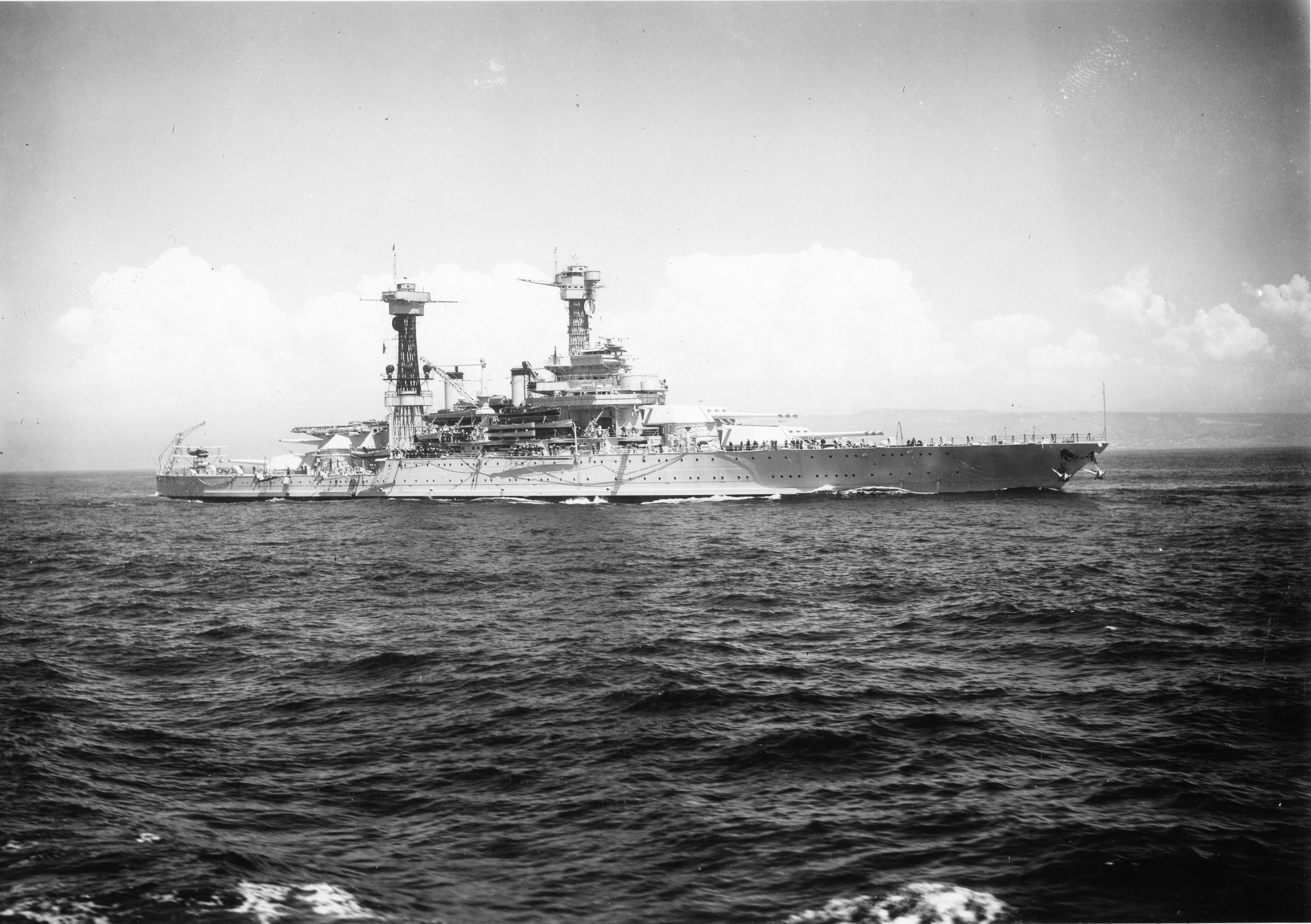
USS California

- Displacement: 32,300 tons
- Armament: 12 × 14 in (356 mm) (4x3), 14 × 5 in (127 mm) (14x1), 2 × 21 in (533 mm) torpedo tubes
- Armor: 13.5in Belt / 3.5in Deck
- Speed: 21 knots
- Ships in class: 2: USS Tennessee, and USS California
- Commissioned: 3 June 1920 (Tennessee)
- Decommissioned: 14 February 1947 (both)
- Fate: sold for scrap 1959

Ship	Main guns	Armor	Displacement	Propulsion	Service				
Ship	Main guns	Armor	Displacement	Propulsion	Laid down	Launched	Commissioned	Decommissioned	Fate
USS Tennessee (BB-43)	12 × 14 in (356 mm) (4x3)	13.5 in Belt / 3.5 in Deck	32,300 tons	2 × Westinghouse electric generators 4 × electric motors 4 × screw propellers	14 May 1917	30 April 1919	3 June 1920	14 February 1947	Struck 1 March 1959; Sold for scrap 10 July 1959
USS California (BB-44)	12 × 14 in (356 mm) (4x3)	13.5 in Belt / 3.5 in Deck	32,300 tons	2 × Westinghouse electric generators 4 × electric motors 4 × screw propellers	25 October 1916	20 November 1919	10 August 1921	14 February 1947	Struck 1 March 1959; Sold for scrap 10 July 1959

=== Colorado class ===
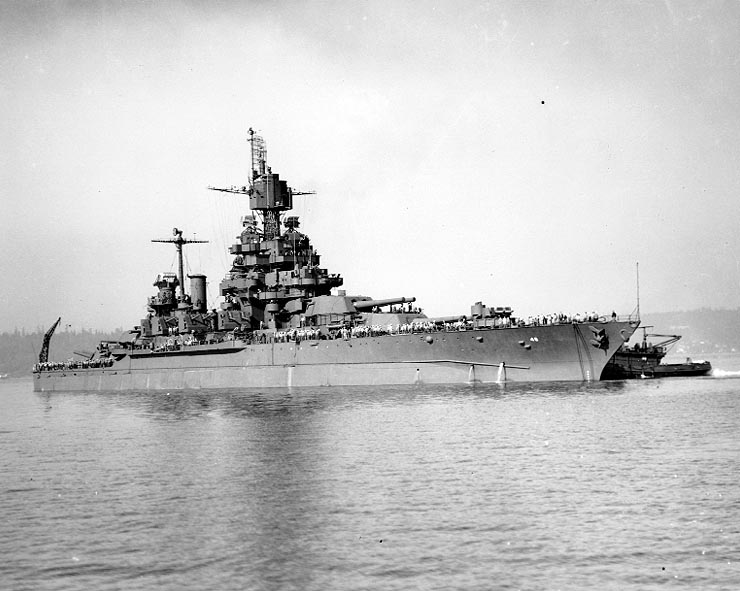
USS Maryland

- Displacement: 32,600 tons
- Armament: 8 × 16 in (406 mm) (4x2), 12 × 5 in (127 mm) (12x1), 8 × 3 in (76 mm) (8x1), 2 × 21 in (533 mm) torpedo tubes
- Armor:13.5in Belt / 3.5in Deck
- Speed: 21 knots
- Ships in class: 4: USS Colorado, USS Maryland, USS Washington, and USS West Virginia
- Commissioned: Maryland in 1921, Colorado and West Virginia in 1923, Washington not completed and sunk as target
- Fate: Remaining three decommissioned 1947 and sold for scrap 1959.

Ship	Main guns	Armor	Displacement	Propulsion	Service				
Ship	Main guns	Armor	Displacement	Propulsion	Laid down	Launched	Commissioned	Decommissioned	Fate
USS Colorado (BB-45)	8 × 16 in (406 mm) (4x2)	13.5in Belt / 3.5in Deck	32,600 tons	4 × screws turbo-electric transmission	29 May 1919	22 March 1921	30 August 1923	7 January 1947	Struck 1 March 1959; Sold for scrap, 23 July 1959
USS Maryland (BB-46)	8 × 16 in (406 mm) (4x2)	13.5in Belt / 3.5in Deck	32,600 tons	4 × screws turbo-electric transmission	24 April 1917	20 March 1920	21 July 1921	3 April 1947	Struck 1 March 1959; Sold for scrap, 8 July 1959
USS Washington (BB-47)	8 × 16 in (406 mm) (4x2)	13.5in Belt / 3.5in Deck	32,600 tons	4 × screws turbo-electric transmission	30 June 1919	1 September 1921	—N/a		Cancelled after signing of Washington Naval Treaty; Sunk as target, 25 November 1924
USS West Virginia (BB-48)	8 × 16 in (406 mm) (4x2)	13.5in Belt / 3.5in Deck	32,600 tons	4 × screws turbo-electric transmission	12 April 1920	17 November 1921	1 December 1923	9 January 1947	Struck 1 March 1959; Sold for scrap, 24 August 1959

=== South Dakota class (1920) ===
- Displacement: 43,200 tons
- Armament: 12 × 16 in (406 mm) (4x3), 16 × 6 in (152 mm) (16x1), 8 × 3 in (76 mm) (8x1), 2 × 21 in (533 mm) torpedo tubes
- Armor: 13.5in Belt / 4.75in Deck
- Speed: 23 knots
- Ships in class: 6: USS South Dakota, USS Indiana, USS Montana, USS North Carolina, USS Iowa, and USS Massachusetts
- Fate: Because of the Washington Naval Treaty, all were cancelled and scrapped on their slips prior to launch in 1923.

Ship	Main guns	Armor	Displacement	Propulsion					
Ship	Main guns	Armor	Displacement	Propulsion	Laid down	Suspended	Canceled	% Completed	Fate
USS South Dakota (BB-49)	12 × 16 in (406 mm) (4x3)	13.5in Belt / 4.75in Deck	43,200 tons	4 × propeller shafts 4 × turbo-electric generators	15 March 1920	8 February 1922	17 August 1922	38.5%	Sold for scrap, 25 October 1923
USS Indiana (BB-50)	12 × 16 in (406 mm) (4x3)	13.5in Belt / 4.75in Deck	43,200 tons	4 × propeller shafts 4 × turbo-electric generators	1 November 1920	8 February 1922	17 August 1922	34.7%	Scrapped on slipway
USS Montana (BB-51)	12 × 16 in (406 mm) (4x3)	13.5in Belt / 4.75in Deck	43,200 tons	4 × propeller shafts 4 × turbo-electric generators	1 September 1920	8 February 1922	17 August 1922	27.6%	Sold for scrap, 25 October 1923
USS North Carolina (BB-52)	12 × 16 in (406 mm) (4x3)	13.5in Belt / 4.75in Deck	43,200 tons	4 × propeller shafts 4 × turbo-electric generators	12 January 1920	8 February 1922	17 August 1922	36.7%	Sold for scrap, 25 October 1923
USS Iowa (BB-53)	12 × 16 in (406 mm) (4x3)	13.5in Belt / 4.75in Deck	43,200 tons	4 × propeller shafts 4 × turbo-electric generators	17 May 1920	8 February 1922	17 August 1922	31.8%	Sold for scrap, 8 November 1923
USS Massachusetts (BB-54)	12 × 16 in (406 mm) (4x3)	13.5in Belt / 4.75in Deck	43,200 tons	4 × propeller shafts 4 × turbo-electric generators	4 April 1921	8 February 1922	17 August 1922	11.0%	Sold for scrap, 8 November 1923

== Fast battleships ==
The term "fast battleship" was applied to new designs in the early 1910s incorporating propulsion technology that allowed for higher speeds without sacrificing armour protection. The US Navy began introducing fast battleships into service following the Second London Naval Treaty of 1936, with a total of ten across three classes entering service.

=== North Carolina class ===
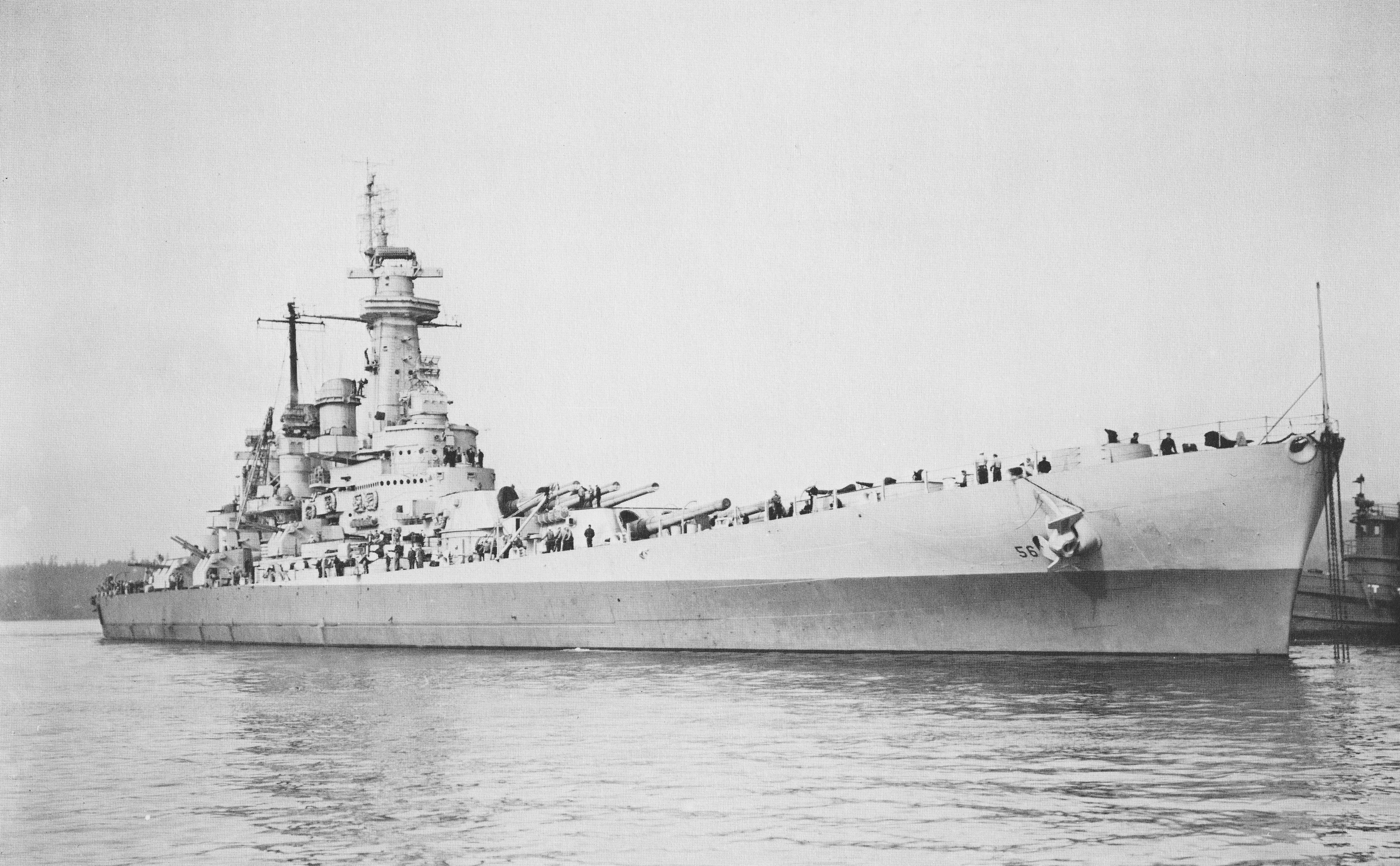
USS Washington

- Displacement: 35,000 tons
- Armament: 9 × 16 in (406 mm) (3x3), 20 × 5 in (127 mm) (10x2), 16 × 1.1 inch AA (4x4)
- Armor: 12in Belt / 7in Deck
- Speed: 28 knots
- Ships in class: 2: USS North Carolina and USS Washington
- Commissioned: 1941
- Fate: North Carolina preserved as memorial 1965; Washington scrapped 1962

Ship	Main guns	Armor	Displacement	Propulsion	Service				
Ship	Main guns	Armor	Displacement	Propulsion	Laid down	Launched	Commissioned	Decommissioned	Fate
USS North Carolina (BB-55)	9 × 16 in (406 mm) (3x3)	12in Belt / 7in Deck	35,000 tons	4 × General Electric geared turbines 4 × screws	27 October 1937	13 June 1940	9 April 1941	27 June 1947	Struck 1 June 1960; Museum ship since 29 April 1962 Wilmington, North Carolina
USS Washington (BB-56)	9 × 16 in (406 mm) (3x3)	12in Belt / 7in Deck	35,000 tons	4 × General Electric geared turbines 4 × screws	14 June 1938	1 June 1940	15 May 1941	27 June 1947	Struck 1 June 1960; Sold for scrap, 24 May 1961

=== South Dakota class (1939) ===
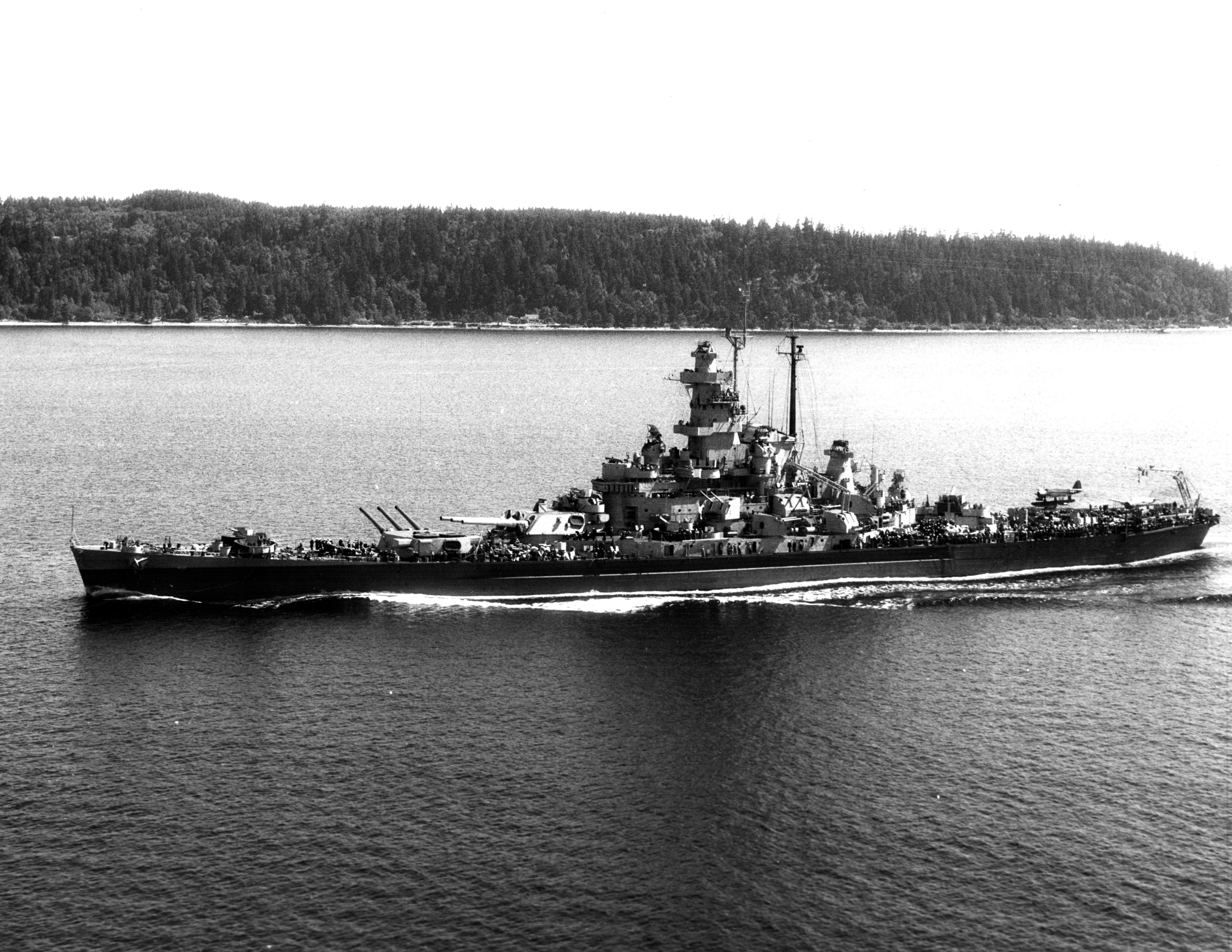
USS Massachusetts

- Displacement: 38,000 tons
- Armament: 9 × 16 in (406 mm) (3×3), 20 (16 on South Dakota) × 5 inch (10 or 8 × 2), up to 68 × 40 mm AA (17 × 4), up to 76 × 20 mm AA (76x1), 3 aircraft
- Armor: 12.2in Belt / 7.5in Deck
- Speed: 27 knots
- Ships in class: 4: USS South Dakota, USS Indiana, USS Massachusetts, and USS Alabama
- Commissioned: 1942
- Fate: South Dakota and Indiana scrapped 1962 and 1963 respectively; Alabama preserved as memorial 1964; Massachusetts preserved as memorial 1965

Ship	Main guns	Armor	Displacement	Propulsion	Service				
Ship	Main guns	Armor	Displacement	Propulsion	Laid down	Launched	Commissioned	Decommissioned	Fate
USS South Dakota (BB-57)	9 × 16 in (406 mm) (3×3)	12.2in Belt / 7.5in Deck	38,000 tons	4 × screws 4 × geared steam turbines	5 July 1939	7 June 1941	20 March 1942	31 January 1947	Struck 1 June 1962; Sold for scrap, 25 October 1962
USS Indiana (BB-58)	9 × 16 in (406 mm) (3×3)	12.2in Belt / 7.5in Deck	38,000 tons	4 × screws 4 × geared steam turbines	20 September 1939	21 November 1941	30 April 1942	11 September 1947	Struck 1 June 1962; Sold for scrap, 23 October 1963
USS Massachusetts (BB-59)	9 × 16 in (406 mm) (3×3)	12.2in Belt / 7.5in Deck	38,000 tons	4 × screws 4 × geared steam turbines	20 July 1939	23 September 1941	12 May 1942	27 March 1947	Struck 1 June 1962; Museum ship at Battleship Cove in Fall River, Massachusetts, since 14 August 1965
USS Alabama (BB-60)	9 × 16 in (406 mm) (3×3)	12.2in Belt / 7.5in Deck	38,000 tons	4 × screws 4 × geared steam turbines	1 February 1940	16 February 1942	16 August 1942	9 January 1947	Struck 1 June 1962; Museum ship at Battleship Memorial Park in Mobile, Alabama, since 11 June 1964

=== Iowa class ===
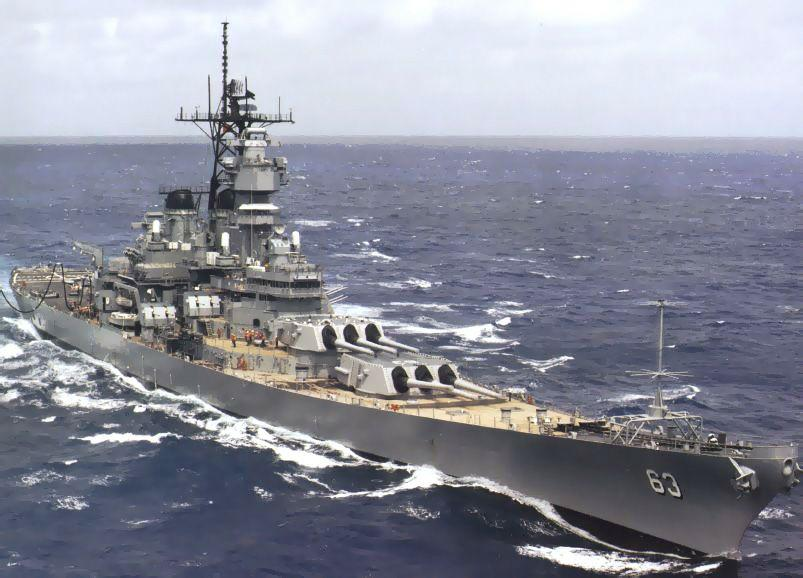
USS Missouri (1980s refit)

- Displacement: 48,500 tons
- Armament: 9 × 16 in (406 mm) (3x3), 20 × 5 in (127 mm) (10x2), 80 × 40 mm AA (20x4), 49 × 20 mm AA (49x1) (1980s modification added 32 × Tomahawk and 16 × Harpoon missiles and 4 × Phalanx CIWS, and deleted 8 5-in guns and all other light anti-aircraft gun systems)
- Armor: 12in Belt / 7.5in Deck
- Speed: 33 knots
- Ships in class: 6: USS Iowa, USS New Jersey, USS Missouri, USS Wisconsin, USS Illinois, and USS Kentucky
- Commissioned: Four commissioned; first, Iowa 1943; last, Missouri 1944.
- Fate: Iowa preserved as memorial in San Pedro, California; Missouri preserved as memorial at Pearl Harbor, Hawaii; Wisconsin preserved as memorial in Norfolk, Virginia; New Jersey preserved as memorial in Camden, NJ; Illinois cancelled and scrapped on slip (bell currently at the University of Illinois at Urbana–Champaign's Memorial Stadium (University of Illinois), home of the Illinois Fighting Illini football team, traditionally rung when the Illini score a touchdown); Kentucky launched 1950, not completed, scrapped 1958.

Ship	Main guns	Armor	Displacement	Propulsion	Service				
Ship	Main guns	Armor	Displacement	Propulsion	Laid down	Launched	Commissioned	Decommissioned	Fate
USS Iowa (BB-61)	9 × 16 in (406 mm) (3x3)	12.1 in Belt / 7.5in Deck	48,500 tons	4 × screws 4 × geared steam turbines	27 June 1940	27 August 1942	22 February 1943	24 March 1949	Preserved as museum ship in Los Angeles, California
USS Iowa (BB-61)	9 × 16 in (406 mm) (3x3)	12.1 in Belt / 7.5in Deck	48,500 tons	4 × screws 4 × geared steam turbines	27 June 1940	27 August 1942	25 August 1951	24 February 1958	Preserved as museum ship in Los Angeles, California
USS Iowa (BB-61)	9 × 16 in (406 mm) (3x3)	12.1 in Belt / 7.5in Deck	48,500 tons	4 × screws 4 × geared steam turbines	27 June 1940	27 August 1942	28 April 1984	26 October 1990	Preserved as museum ship in Los Angeles, California
USS New Jersey (BB-62)	9 × 16 in (406 mm) (3x3)	12.1 in Belt / 7.5in Deck	48,500 tons	4 × screws 4 × geared steam turbines	16 September 1940	7 December 1942	23 May 1943	30 June 1948	Preserved as museum ship in Camden, New Jersey
USS New Jersey (BB-62)	9 × 16 in (406 mm) (3x3)	12.1 in Belt / 7.5in Deck	48,500 tons	4 × screws 4 × geared steam turbines	16 September 1940	7 December 1942	21 November 1950	21 August 1957	Preserved as museum ship in Camden, New Jersey
USS New Jersey (BB-62)	9 × 16 in (406 mm) (3x3)	12.1 in Belt / 7.5in Deck	48,500 tons	4 × screws 4 × geared steam turbines	16 September 1940	7 December 1942	6 April 1968	17 December 1969	Preserved as museum ship in Camden, New Jersey
USS New Jersey (BB-62)	9 × 16 in (406 mm) (3x3)	12.1 in Belt / 7.5in Deck	48,500 tons	4 × screws 4 × geared steam turbines	16 September 1940	7 December 1942	28 December 1982	8 February 1991	Preserved as museum ship in Camden, New Jersey
USS Missouri (BB-63)	9 × 16 in (406 mm) (3x3)	12.1 in Belt / 7.5in Deck	48,500 tons	4 × screws 4 × geared steam turbines	6 January 1941	29 January 1944	11 June 1944	26 February 1955	Preserved as museum ship in Pearl Harbor, Hawaii
USS Missouri (BB-63)	9 × 16 in (406 mm) (3x3)	12.1 in Belt / 7.5in Deck	48,500 tons	4 × screws 4 × geared steam turbines	6 January 1941	29 January 1944	10 May 1986	1 March 1992	Preserved as museum ship in Pearl Harbor, Hawaii
USS Wisconsin (BB-64)	9 × 16 in (406 mm) (3x3)	12.1 in Belt / 7.5in Deck	48,500 tons	4 × screws 4 × geared steam turbines	25 January 1941	7 December 1943	16 April 1944	1 July 1948	Preserved as museum ship in Norfolk, Virginia
USS Wisconsin (BB-64)	9 × 16 in (406 mm) (3x3)	12.1 in Belt / 7.5in Deck	48,500 tons	4 × screws 4 × geared steam turbines	25 January 1941	7 December 1943	3 March 1951	8 March 1958	Preserved as museum ship in Norfolk, Virginia
USS Wisconsin (BB-64)	9 × 16 in (406 mm) (3x3)	12.1 in Belt / 7.5in Deck	48,500 tons	4 × screws 4 × geared steam turbines	25 January 1941	7 December 1943	22 October 1988	30 September 1991	Preserved as museum ship in Norfolk, Virginia
USS Illinois (BB-65)	9 × 16 in (406 mm) (3x3)	12.1 in Belt / 7.5in Deck	48,500 tons	4 × screws 4 × geared steam turbines	6 December 1942	—N/a			Cancelled 11 August 1945; Broken up at Philadelphia, 1958
USS Kentucky (BB-66) (BBG-1)	9 × 16 in (406 mm) (3x3)	12.1 in Belt / 7.5in Deck	48,500 tons	4 × screws 4 × geared steam turbines	7 March 1942	20 January 1950	—N/a		Broken up at Baltimore, 1959

=== Montana class ===
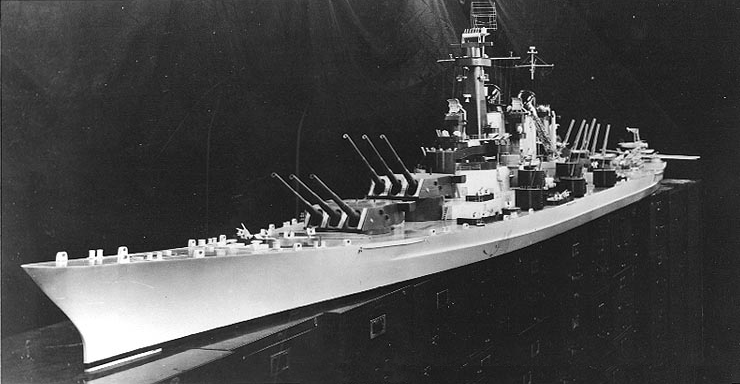
Model of the Montana class

- Displacement: 65,000 tons
- Armament: 12 × 16 in (406 mm) (4x3), 20 × 5 in (127 mm) (10x2), undesignated number of 40 mm and 20 mm
- Armor: 16in Belt / 8.2in Deck
- Speed: 28 knots
- Ships in class: 5: USS Montana, USS Ohio, USS Maine, USS New Hampshire, and USS Louisiana
- Fate: All cancelled in 1943 before being laid down

== Modern-era battleships ==
Retirement of the Iowa class led to a battleship retirement debate on how their capability should be replaced. Vice Admiral Brendan McLane, commander of the Naval Surface Force made a statement saying the Trump class is what the Navy needs. He also stated the Flight III Arleigh Burke-class destroyers could no longer accommodate new systems. The design challenge of the Arleigh Burke class no longer being able to accommodate new systems emphasizes a need for a larger battleship.

=== Trump class ===
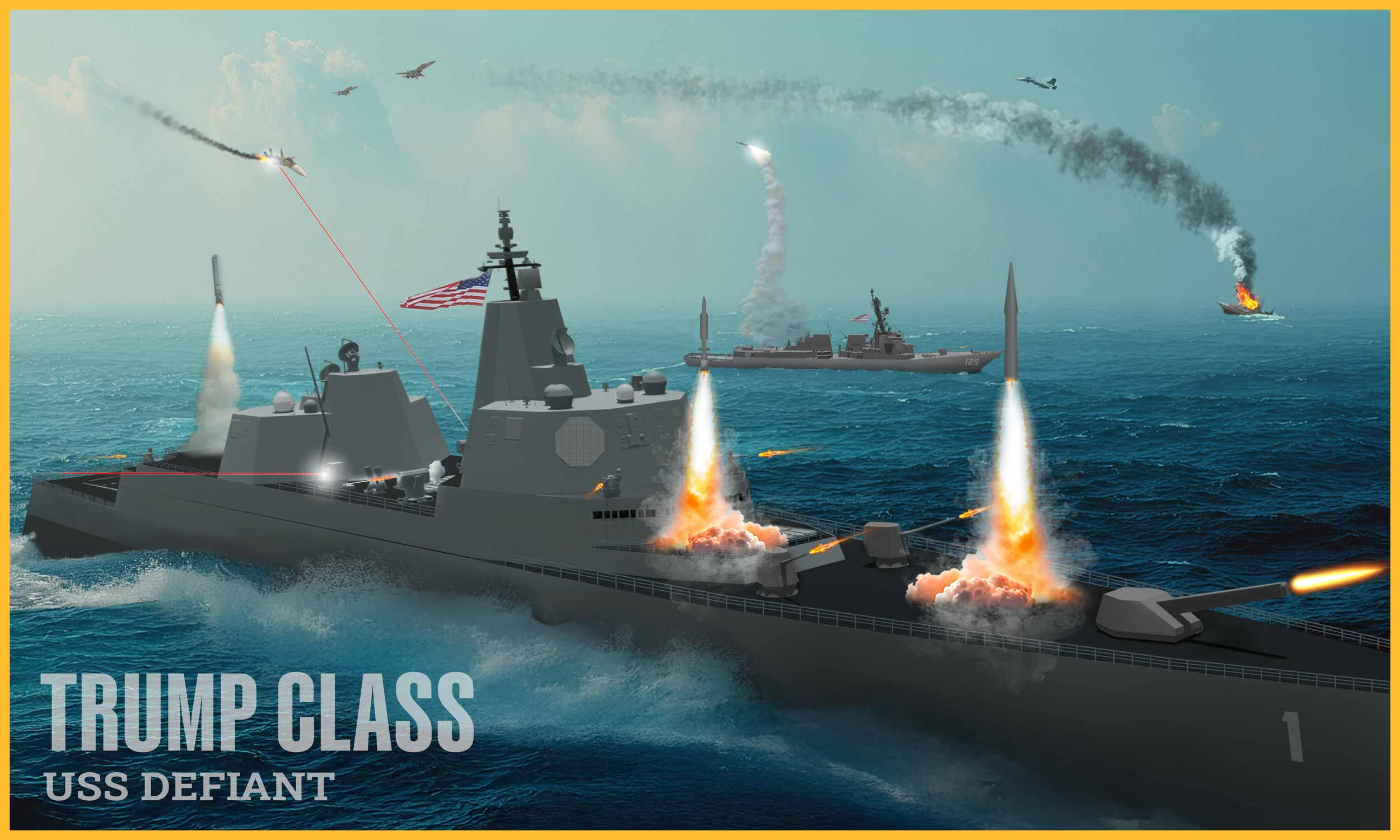
Artist's rendition of the Trump class

- Displacement: 35,000 tons
- Armament: 12 cells Conventional Prompt Strike (CPS), 128 cells Mk 41 Vertical launching system (VLS), 1 × 32 MJ railgun (potentially), 2 × Mk45 5"/62-caliber (127 mm), 4 × Mk38 30 mm (1.18 in), Directed-energy weapon (potentially)
- Speed: 30 knots
- Ships in class: USS Defiant
- Fate: Announced December 22, 2025

== See also ==
- List of battleships
- List of United States Navy ships
- List of United States Navy losses in World War II § Battleships (BB) - abbreviated list
- List of U.S. Navy ships sunk or damaged in action during World War II § Battleships (BB) - detailed list
- Timeline of battleships of the United States Navy
- USS Recruit (1917)
