= Timeline of aircraft carriers of the United States Navy =

This is a bar graph showing a timeline of aircraft carriers of the United States Navy displaying the ships' names and their hull numbers.

== Notes ==
- The carriers are listed in order of hull number.
- Ships with hull numbers 35, 44, 46, and 50 through 58 were cancelled or never commissioned and are not shown.
- While the chart does include light carriers, it does not include amphibious assault ships nor escort carriers with the exception of the Langley which is included for historical context.
- In general, labels for ships of a single class are aligned vertically with the topmost ship in a column carrying the class name.
- In an attempt to show the full timeline of the actual existence of each ship, the final dates on each bar may variously be the date struck, sold, scrapped, scuttled, sunk as a reef, etc., as appropriate to show last time it existed as a floating object.

== See also ==
- Aircraft carrier
- Timeline for aircraft carrier service
- List of United States Navy escort aircraft carriers
- Timeline of battleships of the United States Navy
