= Timeline of battleships of the United States Navy =

This is a bar graph showing a Timeline of battleships of the United States Navy. The ships are listed in order of hull number.

== Notes ==
In general, labels for ships of a single class are aligned vertically with the topmost ship in a column carrying the class name.

In an attempt to show the full timeline of the actual existence of each ship, the final dates on each bar may variously be the date struck, sold, scrapped, scuttled, sunk as a reef, etc., as appropriate to show last time it existed as a floating object.

- The South Dakota-class was cancelled during construction and never commissioned and the assigned hull numbers 49-54 are not shown.
- The USS Washington (BB-47) had been launched and was over 75% completed when she was canceled under the terms of the Washington Naval Treaty in 1922. The name Washington was re-used on BB-56.
- The last two ships of the Iowa-class were also cancelled during construction and the assigned hull numbers 65 and 66 are not shown. The hulls were not scrapped until 1958 and were never launched.
- The Montana-class superbattleships were cancelled prior to construction and the assigned hull numbers 67-71 are not shown.

== See also ==
- Battleship
- Timeline of aircraft carriers of the United States Navy
